= Park Sung-je =

South Korean ice hockey player

Park Sung-je 박성제
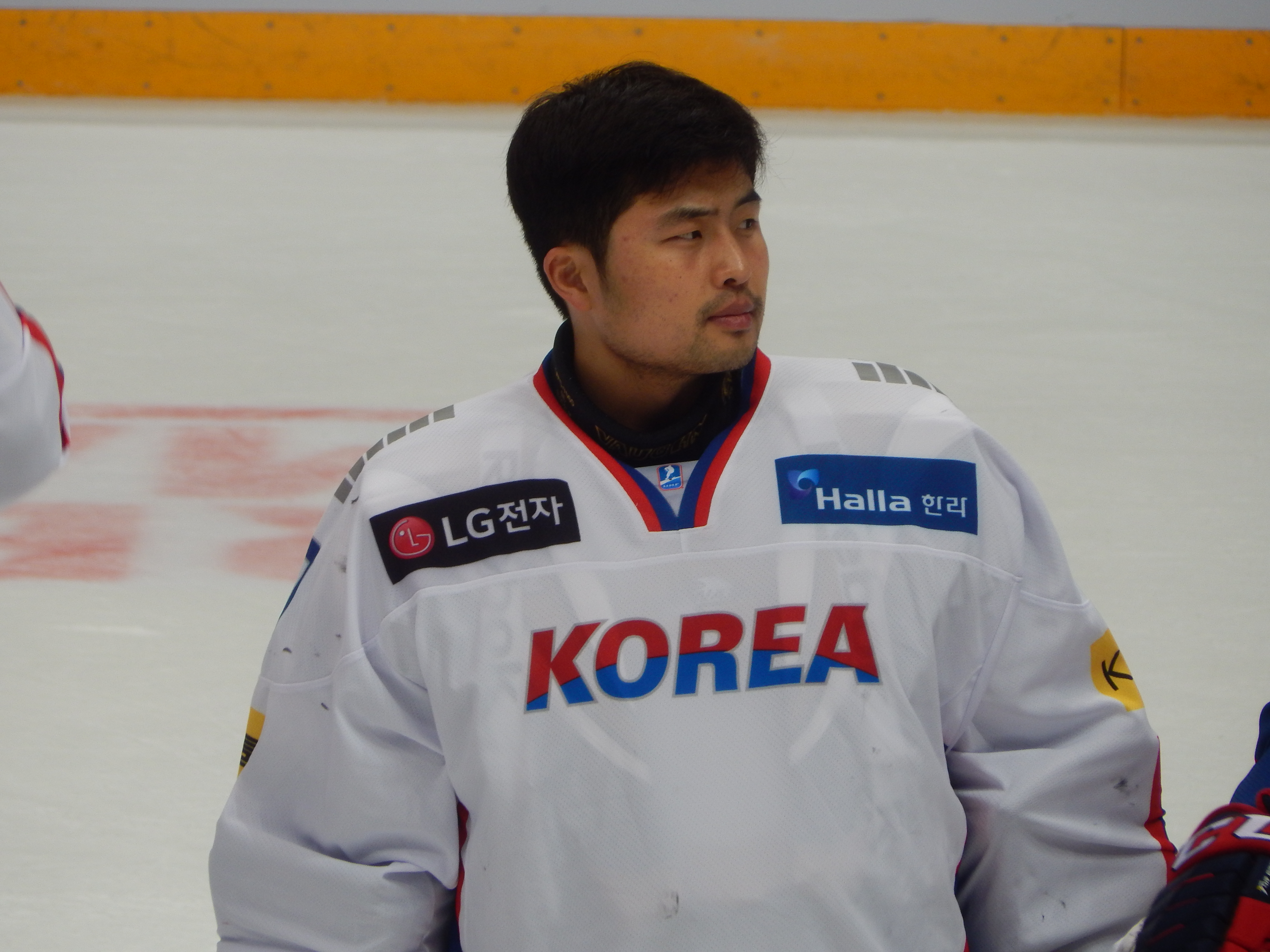
- Park at the 2017 Channel One Cup
- Born: 3 August 1988 (age 38) Seoul, South Korea
- Height: 1.73 m (5 ft 8 in)
- Weight: 82 kg (181 lb; 12 st 13 lb)
- Position: Goaltender
- Caught: Right
- Played for: Gangwon High1; Daemyung Sangmu; Anyang Halla
- National team: South Korea
- Playing career: 2009–2018
Medal record
Asian Winter Games
Silver medal – second place	2017 Sapporo	Ice hockey
Bronze medal – third place	2011 Astana-Almaty	Ice hockey

Park Sung-je or Park Seong-je (Korean: 박성제; born 3 August 1988) is a Korean retired ice hockey goaltender. As a member of the South Korean national team, he participated in the men's ice hockey tournament at the 2018 Winter Olympics in Pyeongchang and in nine Ice Hockey World Championships.

== Playing career ==
Park played ice hockey in the U-League with the men's ice hockey team of Yonsei University during 2007 to 2010.

He made his professional debut in Asia League Ice Hockey (AL) with Anyang Halla on 31 October 2010 and the team was Asia League co-champion of the 2010–11 season. Park remained with the club through the 2012–13 season.

The 2013–14 season was played with Daemyung Sangmu and was one of the most successful campaigns of his professional career – he finished the regular season with a .920 save percentage and 2.72 goals against average across 37 games played.

In the following season, Park signed with Gangwon High1 and recorded a career best .921 save percentage across 46 games played. He continued playing with High1 through the 2017–18 season but his number of games played and goaltending statistics declined precipitously after the 2015–16 season.

== International play ==
As a junior player with the South Korean national under-18 team, Park played in the 2006 IIHF World U18 Championship Division I and the 2008 IIHF World U20 Championship Division II.

His first major tournament with the senior national team was the 2010 IIHF World Championship Division I and he went on represent South Korea at the Division I tournament in 2011; the Division I Group B tournaments in 2012 and 2015; the Division I Group A tournaments in 2013, 2014, 2016, and 2017; and the Top Division tournament in 2018.

Park is a two-time Asian Winter Games medalist, having won silver in the men's ice hockey tournament at Sapporo 2017 and bronze in the men's ice hockey tournament at Astana–Almaty 2011.
