= Eric Regan =

Canadian-Korean ice hockey player (born 1988)

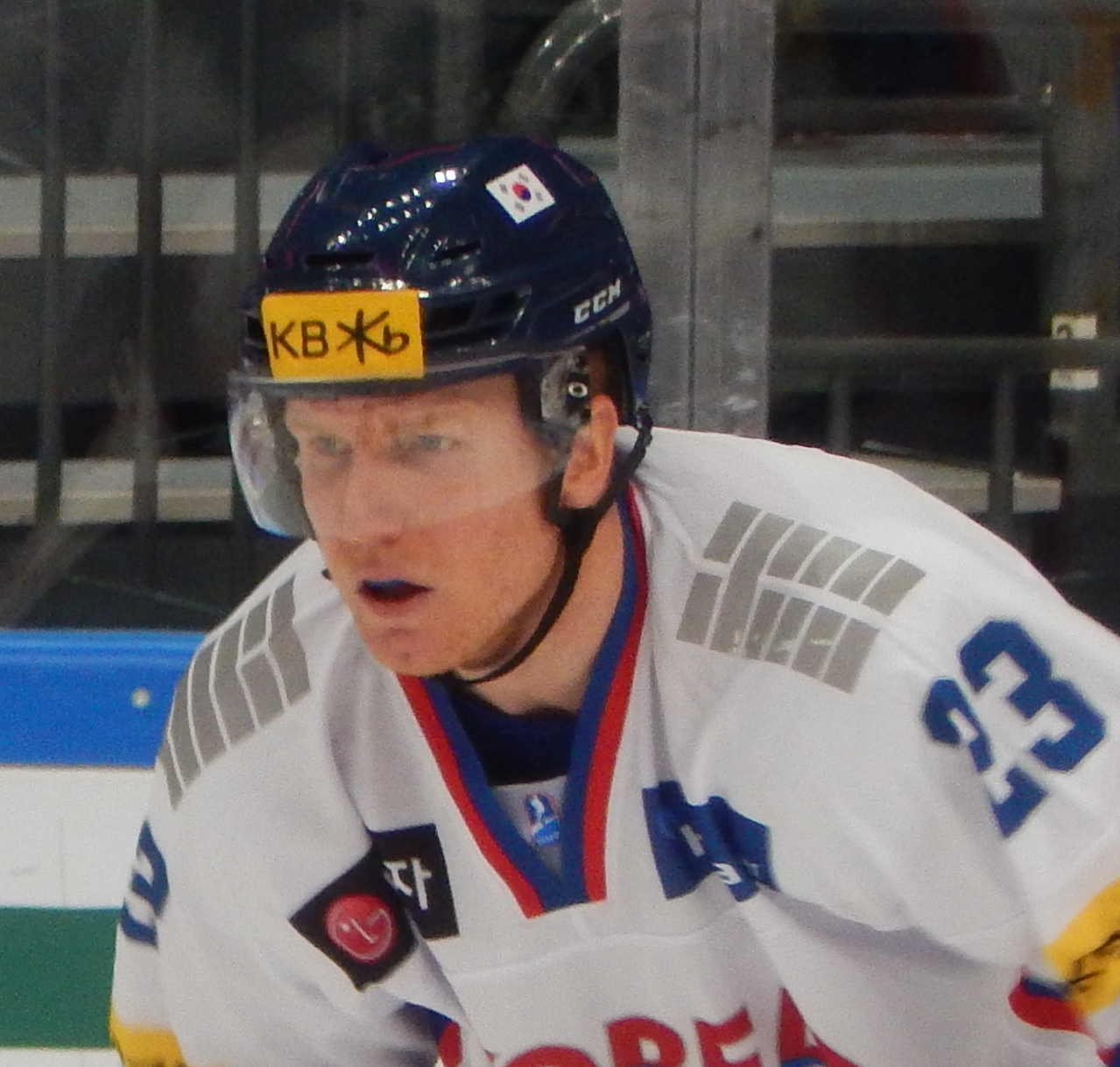
- Born: May 20, 1988 (age 38) Whitby, Ontario, Canada
- Height: 6 ft 2 in (188 cm)
- Weight: 205 lb (93 kg; 14 st 9 lb)
- Position: Defence
- Shoots: Right
- ALH team Former teams: Anyang Halla; Iowa Chops; San Antonio Rampage; Syracuse Crunch; Hannover Scorpions; Nippon Paper Cranes; High1
- National team: South Korea
- NHL draft: Undrafted
- Playing career: 2008–present

Eric Regan (born May 20, 1988) is a Canadian–South Korean professional ice hockey defenceman for Anyang Halla of the Asia League Ice Hockey (ALH).

== Playing career ==
Regan played major junior hockey in the Ontario Hockey League with the Erie Otters and the Oshawa Generals from 2004 to 2008.

Undrafted, on September 22, 2008, he was signed as a free agent by the Anaheim Ducks to a three-year, entry-level contract. Following the completion of his entry-level contract within the Ducks affiliations, Regan signed a one-year contract with German DEL team, the Hannover Scorpions, on June 7, 2011.

Following two seasons with the Scorpions, Regan opted to leave Germany and sign a contract in Asia with Japanese club, Nippon Paper Cranes, on August 9, 2013.

On May 29, 2015, Regan left High1 and joined his third Asia League club in as many seasons, signing with Anyang Halla initially on a one-year contract.

== International play ==
After two years within South Korea, Regan was granted citizenship and made his debut for the national team at the 2016 IIHF World Championship Division I. He was a part of the historic South Korean team that gained promotion at the 2017 IIHF World Championship Division I to their first ever top ranked tournament at the 2018 IIHF World Championship in Denmark.

He was a member of South Korea's 2018 Winter Olympics team, in which they gained entry as the host nation.

== Career statistics ==
=== Regular season and playoffs ===
			Regular season					Playoffs
Season	Team	League	GP	G	A	Pts	PIM	GP	G	A	Pts	PIM
2004–05	Erie Otters	OHL	61	2	2	4	6	6	0	0	0	0
2005–06	Erie Otters	OHL	25	0	3	3	14	—	—	—	—	—
2005–06	Oshawa Generals	OHL	35	3	10	13	16	—	—	—	—	—
2006–07	Oshawa Generals	OHL	64	3	42	45	64	9	1	1	2	7
2007–08	Oshawa Generals	OHL	67	8	40	48	56	15	1	7	8	26
2008–09	Iowa Chops	AHL	59	1	7	8	36	—	—	—	—	—
2009–10	Bakersfield Condors	ECHL	59	16	34	50	46	10	2	4	6	4
2009–10	San Antonio Rampage	AHL	5	0	0	0	6	—	—	—	—	—
2010–11	Elmira Jackals	ECHL	54	13	28	41	61	4	0	2	2	4
2010–11	Syracuse Crunch	AHL	12	0	1	1	9	—	—	—	—	—
2011–12	Hannover Scorpions	DEL	33	5	9	14	67	—	—	—	—	—
2012–13	Hannover Scorpions	DEL	51	7	13	20	54	—	—	—	—	—
2013–14	Nippon Paper Cranes	ALH	35	6	24	30	50	7	2	5	7	4
2014–15	High1	ALH	46	17	36	53	52	6	1	2	3	4
2015–16	Anyang Halla	ALH	47	9	32	41	68	8	0	6	6	0
2016–17	Anyang Halla	ALH	44	11	29	40	28	6	2	3	5	2
2017–18	Anyang Halla	ALH	23	6	7	13	10	8	1	2	3	4
2018–19	Anyang Halla	ALH	34	7	19	26	8	4	0	1	1	2
2019–20	Anyang Halla	ALH	36	5	13	18	6	3	0	2	2	2
AHL totals			76	1	8	9	51	—	—	—	—	—
ALH totals			265	61	160	221	222	42	6	21	27	18

=== International ===
Year	Team	Event	Result	GP	G	A	Pts	PIM
2016	South Korea	WC D1A	21st	5	1	0	1	10
2017	South Korea	AWG	2nd place, silver medalist(s)	3	0	1	1	0
2017	South Korea	WC D1A	18th	4	0	0	0	0
2018	South Korea	OG	12th	4	0	1	1	0
2018	South Korea	WC	16th	7	0	0	0	2
2019	South Korea	WC D1A	19th	5	0	0	0	0
Senior totals				28	1	2	3	12

== Awards and honours ==
Award	Year
ECHL
All-Star Game	2010
First All-Star Team	2010, 2011
Defenseman of the Year	2011
