= Michael Swift (ice hockey) =

Canadian-born South Korean ice hockey player

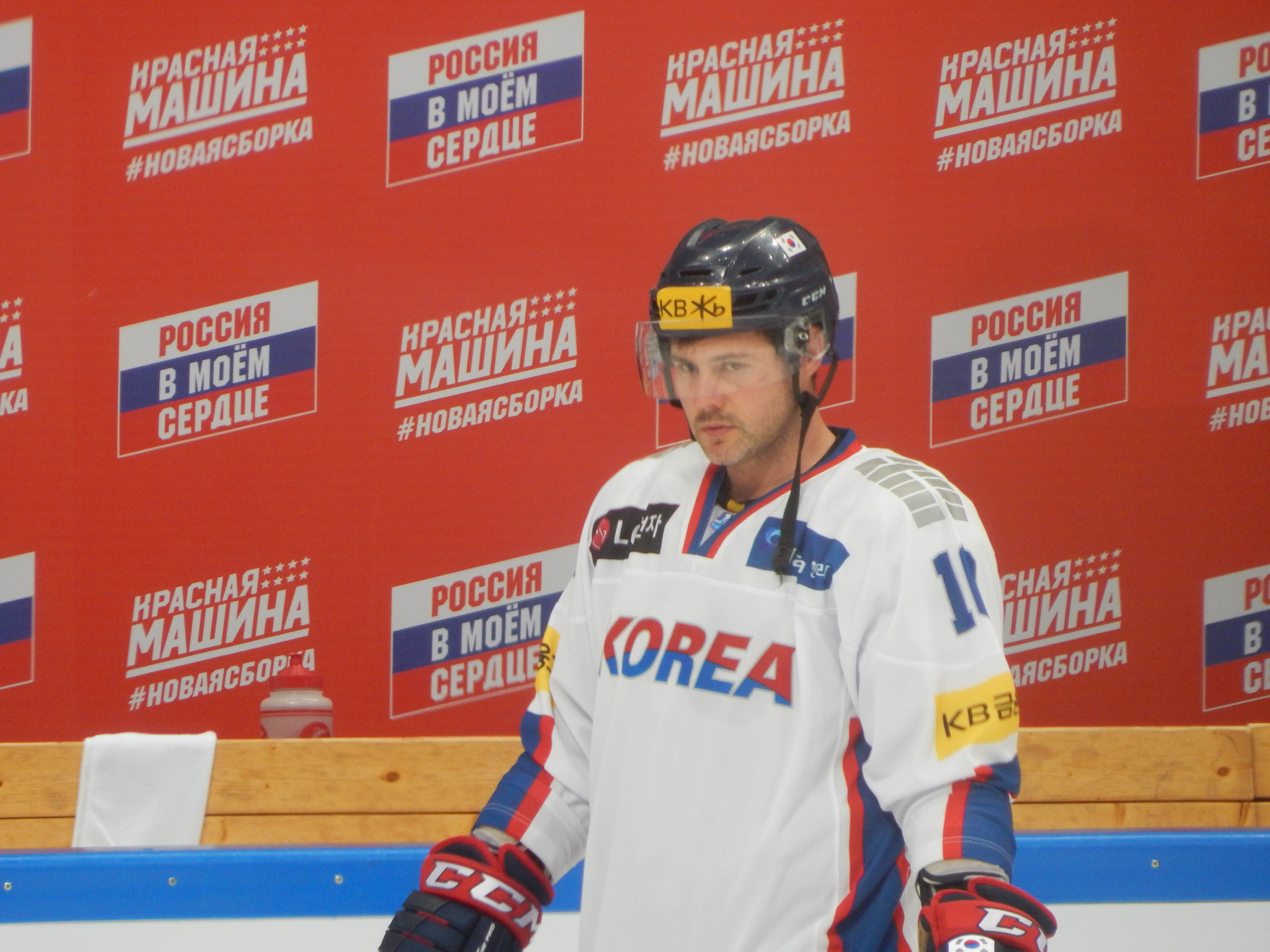
- Born: March 26, 1987 (age 39) Peterborough, Ontario, Canada
- Height: 5 ft 9 in (175 cm)
- Weight: 175 lb (79 kg; 12 st 7 lb)
- Position: Centre
- Shoots: Left
- ALIH team Former teams: Daemyung Killer Whales; Lowell Devils; Albany Devils; Worcester Sharks; High1
- National team: South Korea
- NHL draft: Undrafted
- Playing career: 2008–present

Michael Swift (born March 26, 1987) is a Canadian-born South Korean former professional ice hockey player. He was a member of Korea's 2018 Winter Olympics team.

== Professional career ==
On April 19, 2008, he was signed as a free agent by the New Jersey Devils. During the 2010–11 season, he was traded to the San Jose Sharks along with Patrick Davis in exchange for Steven Zalewski and Jay Leach. He finished the season with the Sharks AHL affiliate, the Worcester Sharks.

=== High1 ===
On August 4, 2011, Swift unconventionally signed in the Asian League with High1. During the 2011–12 season, he was named as the League's MVP after scoring 90 points in just 36 games.

As of 2015–16 season, he was the team's all-time scoring leader, with most goals scored, most assists and points accumulated.

== Career statistics ==
=== Regular season and playoffs ===
| | | | Regular season | | | | | Playoffs |
| Season | Team | League | GP | G | A | Pts | PIM | GP | G | A | Pts | PIM |
|---|---|---|---|---|---|---|---|---|---|---|---|---|
| 2002–03 | Peterborough Bees | OPJHL | 3 | 0 | 0 | 0 | 6 | — | — | — | — | — |
| 2003–04 | Peterborough Bees | OPJHL | 45 | 25 | 19 | 44 | 103 | — | — | — | — | — |
| 2003–04 | Mississauga IceDogs | OHL | 9 | 2 | 2 | 4 | 6 | — | — | — | — | — |
| 2004–05 | Mississauga IceDogs | OHL | 67 | 15 | 17 | 32 | 46 | 5 | 0 | 0 | 0 | 4 |
| 2005–06 | Mississauga IceDogs | OHL | 65 | 22 | 32 | 54 | 46 | — | — | — | — | — |
| 2006–07 | Mississauga IceDogs | OHL | 67 | 34 | 59 | 93 | 76 | 5 | 0 | 1 | 1 | 6 |
| 2006–07 | Laredo Bucks | CHL | — | — | — | — | — | 12 | 1 | 3 | 4 | 8 |
| 2007–08 | Niagara IceDogs | OHL | 68 | 38 | 62 | 100 | 130 | 10 | 9 | 9 | 18 | 22 |
| 2008–09 | Lowell Devils | AHL | 52 | 12 | 15 | 27 | 50 | — | — | — | — | — |
| 2009–10 | Lowell Devils | AHL | 76 | 24 | 31 | 55 | 71 | 4 | 0 | 1 | 1 | 4 |
| 2010–11 | Albany Devils | AHL | 48 | 16 | 12 | 28 | 48 | — | — | — | — | — |
| 2010–11 | Worcester Sharks | AHL | 18 | 1 | 6 | 7 | 28 | — | — | — | — | — |
| 2011–12 | High1 | ALH | 36 | 44 | 46 | 90 | 84 | — | — | — | — | — |
| 2012–13 | High1 | ALH | 40 | 39 | 58 | 97 | 119 | — | — | — | — | — |
| 2013–14 | High1 | ALH | 41 | 37 | 30 | 67 | 110 | 3 | 0 | 2 | 2 | 6 |
| 2014–15 | High1 | ALH | 48 | 34 | 46 | 80 | 114 | 6 | 2 | 3 | 5 | 8 |
| 2015–16 | High1 | ALH | 48 | 31 | 39 | 70 | 119 | — | — | — | — | — |
| 2016–17 | High1 | ALH | 46 | 23 | 34 | 57 | 116 | — | — | — | — | — |
| 2017–18 | High1 | ALH | 27 | 14 | 28 | 42 | 71 | — | — | — | — | — |
| 2018–19 | Daemyung Killer Whales | ALH | 34 | 9 | 23 | 32 | 54 | 3 | 2 | 0 | 2 | 29 |
| AHL totals | | | 194 | 53 | 64 | 117 | 197 | 4 | 0 | 1 | 1 | 4 |
| ALH totals | | | 320 | 231 | 304 | 535 | 787 | 12 | 4 | 5 | 9 | 43 |

=== International ===
| Year | Team | Event | GP | G | A | Pts | PIM |
|---|---|---|---|---|---|---|---|
| 2014 | South Korea | WC D1A | 5 | 1 | 2 | 3 | 29 |
| 2015 | South Korea | WC D1B | 5 | 5 | 4 | 9 | 14 |
| 2016 | South Korea | WC D1A | 5 | 5 | 0 | 5 | 12 |
| 2017 | South Korea | AWG | 3 | 2 | 1 | 3 | 0 |
| 2017 | South Korea | WC D1A | 5 | 1 | 3 | 4 | 6 |
| 2018 | South Korea | OG | 4 | 0 | 1 | 1 | 2 |
| 2018 | South Korea | WC | 7 | 1 | 0 | 1 | 10 |
| Senior totals | | | 34 | 15 | 11 | 26 | 73 |

== Records ==
High1

- Team all-time leader for Most Goals
- Team all-time leader for Most Assists
- Team all-time leader for Most Points
- First player in team history to score 100 Goals
- First player in team history to record 100 Assists and 100 Goals
- First player in team history to record 200 Points
- First player in team history to record 200 Assists and 150 Goals
- First player in team history to record 300 Points
- First player in team history to record 400 Points

Asia League Ice Hockey

- Fastest player in Asia league history to reach 100 Goals scored(90 games)
- Highest points per game ratio during career, with 2.34(as of 13/14)

== Awards and honours ==
| Award | Year |
|---|---|
Ontario Hockey League
| Leo Lalonde Memorial Trophy | 2008 |

- Asia League Ice Hockey

2011–2012 ALH season:

- Asia League Best Plus/Minus (+52)
- Asia League Most Assists (46)
- Asia League Most Goals (44)
- Asia League Most Points (90)
- Asia League Regular Season MVP

2012–2013 ALH season:

- Asia League Most Assists (58)
- Asia League Most Goals (39)
- Asia League Most Points (97)

2013–2014 ALH season:

- Asia League Most Goals (37)
- Asia League Most Points (67)

2014–2015 ALH season:

- Asia League Most Points (80)

2015–2016 ALH season:

- Asia League Most Points (70)
