= Bryan Young (ice hockey) =

Canadian-Korean ice hockey player (born 1986)

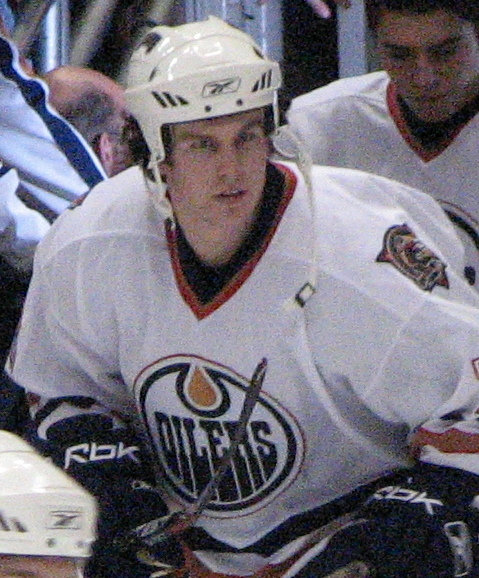
- Young with the Edmonton Oilers in 2007
- Born: August 6, 1986 (age 39) Ennismore, Ontario, Canada
- Height: 6 ft 1 in (185 cm)
- Weight: 191 lb (87 kg; 13 st 9 lb)
- Position: Defence
- Shot: Left
- ALH team Former teams: Daemyung Killer Whales; Edmonton Oilers; High1
- National team: South Korea
- NHL draft: 146th overall, 2004; Edmonton Oilers
- Playing career: 2007–2020

Bryan Young (born August 6, 1986) is a Canadian-born South Korean ice hockey defenceman currently playing for Daemyung Killer Whales of the Asia League Ice Hockey. He was selected in the 5th round, 146th overall, in the 2004 NHL entry draft by the Edmonton Oilers.

== Playing career ==
Born in Ennismore, Ontario, Young played in 186 games over four years with the Peterborough Petes of the Ontario Hockey League. He was not known for his offensive game, as he collected only 30 points over that span. Instead, he was regarded as a solid, stay-at-home defenceman.

Young opened the 2006–07 season playing for the Milwaukee Admirals of the American Hockey League, but due to the Oilers not having their farm team, was soon sent down to the Stockton Thunder of the ECHL. When a space opened up with the Wilkes-Barre/Scranton Penguins, he was moved there.

Due to a rash of injuries, Young was called up to the Edmonton Oilers in March 2007.

To start the 2007–08 season, Young played for the Oilers new AHL affiliate, the Springfield Falcons.

A free agent after his entry-level contract in June 2010, Young signed a one-year deal with High1 of Asia League Ice Hockey.

On January 21, 2014, Young became a naturalized citizen of South Korea.

== Career statistics ==
=== Regular season and playoffs ===
			Regular season					Playoffs
Season	Team	League	GP	G	A	Pts	PIM	GP	G	A	Pts	PIM
2002–03	Lindsay Muskies	OPJHL	47	1	9	10	56	11	0	0	0	13
2002–03	Peterborough Petes	OHL	2	0	0	0	0	—	—	—	—	—
2003–04	Peterborough Petes	OHL	60	0	8	8	63	—	—	—	—	—
2004–05	Peterborough Petes	OHL	60	1	11	12	44	14	0	1	1	10
2005–06	Peterborough Petes	OHL	64	0	10	10	113	19	0	0	0	37
2006–07	Edmonton Oilers	NHL	15	0	0	0	10	—	—	—	—	—
2006–07	Milwaukee Admirals	AHL	22	0	0	0	6	—	—	—	—	—
2006–07	Stockton Thunder	ECHL	17	0	4	4	24	—	—	—	—	—
2006–07	Wilkes–Barre/Scranton Penguins	AHL	10	0	1	1	2	4	0	1	1	2
2007–08	Edmonton Oilers	NHL	2	0	0	0	0	—	—	—	—	—
2007–08	Springfield Falcons	AHL	74	0	7	7	62	—	—	—	—	—
2008–09	Springfield Falcons	AHL	63	3	7	10	64	—	—	—	—	—
2009–10	Springfield Falcons	AHL	7	0	0	0	11	—	—	—	—	—
2009–10	Stockton Thunder	ECHL	45	4	7	11	49	15	2	1	3	16
2010–11	High1	ALH	34	3	17	20	36	—	—	—	—	—
2011–12	High1	ALH	36	4	42	46	64	—	—	—	—	—
2012–13	High1	ALH	41	8	24	32	52	—	—	—	—	—
2013–14	High1	ALH	41	9	20	29	134	2	0	0	0	2
2014–15	High1	ALH	45	7	13	20	83	6	0	3	3	6
2015–16	High1	ALH	43	5	22	27	90	—	—	—	—	—
2016–17	High1	ALH	22	3	10	13	10	—	—	—	—	—
2017–18	Daemyung Killer Whales	ALH	21	0	5	5	20	—	—	—	—	—
2018–19	Daemyung Killer Whales	ALH	34	1	4	5	58	3	0	0	0	2
2019–20	Daemyung Killer Whales	ALH	36	2	8	10	61	2	0	0	0	4
NHL totals			17	0	0	0	10	—	—	—	—	—
AHL totals			176	3	15	18	145	4	0	1	1	2
ALH totals			353	42	165	207	608	13	0	3	3	14

=== International ===
Year	Team	Event	GP	G	A	Pts	PIM
2014	South Korea	WC D1A	2	0	0	0	0
2016	South Korea	WC D1A	5	0	1	1	6
2017	South Korea	AWG	3	0	0	0	6
2017	South Korea	WC D1A	5	0	0	0	4
2018	South Korea	OG	4	0	0	0	4
2018	South Korea	WC	6	0	0	0	12
Senior totals			25	0	1	1	32
