= 2005–06 Asia League Ice Hockey season =

The 2005–06 Asia League Ice Hockey season was the third season of Asia League Ice Hockey. Nine teams participated in the league, and Kokudo Ice Hockey Club won the championship.

== Regular season ==
	Club	GP	W	OTW	T	OTL	L	GF–GA	Pts
1.	Nippon Paper Cranes	38	30	2	1	0	5	240–66	95
2.	Anyang Halla	38	25	0	0	3	10	164–100	78
3.	Kokudo Ice Hockey Club	38	24	0	4	1	9	156–78	77
4.	Oji Eagles	38	22	0	4	2	10	159–87	72
5.	Nordic Vikings	38	20	2	1	0	15	129–108	65
6.	Nikkō Kōbe Ice Bucks	38	16	2	2	1	17	103–118	55
7.	Kangwon Land	38	7	2	2	1	26	96–143	28
8.	Harbin Ice Hockey Team	38	7	1	1	0	29	68–198	24
9.	Qiqihar Ice Hockey Team	38	3	0	1	1	33	61–278	11

== Playoffs ==
Pre-Playoffs
4	Oji Eagles	3
5	Nordic Vikings	1
3	Kokudo Ice Hockey Club	3
6	Nikkō Kōbe Ice Bucks	0

Semifinals
1	Nippon Paper Cranes	3
4	Ōji Eagles	0
2	Anyang Halla	1
3	Kokudo Ice Hockey Club	3

Final
1	Nippon Paper Cranes	2
3	Kokudo Ice Hockey Club	3
