= Beijing International Ice Hockey League =

Ice hockey league based in Beijing

- Sport: Ice hockey
- Founded: 1995
- CEO: (Canada) Gervais Lavoie (Canada) Ray Plummer
- No. of teams: 6
- Country: China
- Most recent champion(s): Emperors
- Official website: beijinghockey.com

The Beijing International Ice Hockey League (BIIHL) is a non-professional ice hockey league based in Beijing. Most of the players are expatriates and come from all around the world. Since the beginning of the 2008-09 season, the league plays all games at the Beijing Hosa rink (Chaoyang District, Beijing).

The Beijing International Ice Hockey League is managed by the Beijing International Ice Hockey Group which also proposes some youth hockey, and other events related to ice hockey in Asia. It is a private league and has official relationship with the Chinese Ice Hockey Association.

== Teams ==
The Beijing International Ice Hockey League has 6 teams. In order to face the International Ice Hockey boom in Beijing, the Warriors were created in the beginning of the 2009-10 season.

Team	Arena	Joined BIIHL
Bull Dogs	Hokay rink, Chaoyang District, Beijing	?
Dragons	Hoka rink, Chaoyang District, Beijing	?
Emperors	Hokay rink, Chaoyang District, Beijing	2007
Hot wings	Hokay rink, Chaoyang District, Beijing	?
Icehogs	Hokay rink, Chaoyang District, Beijing	?
Warriors	Hokay rink, Chaoyang District, Beijing	2009
Revs	Hokay rink, Chaoyang District, Beijing	?
Bears	Hokay rink, Chaoyang District, Beijing	2014

== Other events ==
=== In Beijing ===
The Beijing Expat Cup have been first time organized in 2007. Dalian team won the first edition. Several international teams from all China and Mongolia gathered for the opened 2008 edition which have been won by the Icehogs.

While the Beijing International Ice Hockey League is composed with a significant number of players from Asian origins, only a few players really holds the Chinese nationality. However, in an effort to see more competitive ice hockey games in Beijing, executive George Smith organized series against some local Chinese players during Spring 2009. The international team was composed with some invited players from the Beijing International Ice Hockey League, and the Chinese team was composed with ex-national Chinese team players living in Beijing and ex-pro players from both defunct Hosa and Nordic Vikings. The international team won the 2009 series.

=== Outside of Beijing ===
Many tours have been organized all around Asia in Dubai, Hong Kong, Bangkok, etc. In autumn of 2008, the Beijing International Ice Hockey Group travelled to North Korea to play against local teams.

The Beijing International Ice Hockey Group also supports ice hockey development in Mongolia, and helps to organize an outdoor international tournament in Ulan Bator traditionally standing during the Chinese New Year Festival.

== Beijing International Ice Hockey Champions ==
Season	Winner
2007-08	Icehogs
2008-09	Emperors

== See also ==
- China Dragon
- Nordic Vikings
