= Evan Stoflet =

American ice hockey player (born 1984)

- Born: May 16, 1984 (age 41) Madison, Wisconsin, U.S.
- Height: 6 ft 1 in (185 cm)
- Weight: 185 lb (84 kg; 13 st 3 lb)
- Position: Defense
- Shot: Right
- Ligue Magnus team: Briançon
- Played for: Bakersfield Condors; Copenhagen Hockey; Elmira Jackals; Esbjerg Energy; China Dragon; Utah Grizzlies; ASC Corona Brașov; Milton Keynes Lightning; Fife Flyers
- NHL draft: Undrafted
- Playing career: 2007–2019

Evan Stoflet (born May 16, 1984) is an American former professional ice hockey Defenseman.

Undrafted, he formerly played for China Dragon, a Chinese team playing in Asia League Ice Hockey. After two seasons in China, Stoflet opted to return to North America, signing a one-year deal in a return to his first ECHL club, the Utah Grizzlies on August 29, 2016.

In the 2016–17 season, Stoflet in a defensive minded role contributed with 9 points in 45 games. At the conclusion of his contract with the Grizzlies, Stoflet returned to Europe in agreeing to a one-year deal with Romania club, ASC Corona Brașov of the Erste Liga on July 23, 2017.

After spending the second half of the 2017–18 season with EIHL side Milton Keynes Lightning, Stoflet then joined fellow Elite League side Fife Flyers in August 2018.

Stoflet spent the 2019–20 season in France with Briançon in the Ligue Magnus.
