= Robert Horák =

Czech ice hockey player

- Born: January 12, 1982 (age 43); Prague, Czechoslovakia
- Height: 6 ft 4 in (193 cm)
- Weight: 207 lb (94 kg; 14 st 11 lb)
- Position: Defence
- Shot: Left
- Played for: HK Dukla Trenčín; MsHK Žilina; HKm Nitra; HC Vsetín; Hosa Ice Hockey Team; HYS The Hague
- Playing career: 2001–2011

Robert Horák (born January 12, 1982) is a Czech former professional ice hockey defenceman.

Horák played eighteen games in the Czech Extraliga for HC Vsetín. He also played in the Slovak Extraliga for HK Dukla Trenčín, MsHK Žilina and HKm Nitra, the Asia League Ice Hockey for Hosa Ice Hockey Team and the Eredivisie for HYS The Hague.
