= Mikhail Nemirovsky =

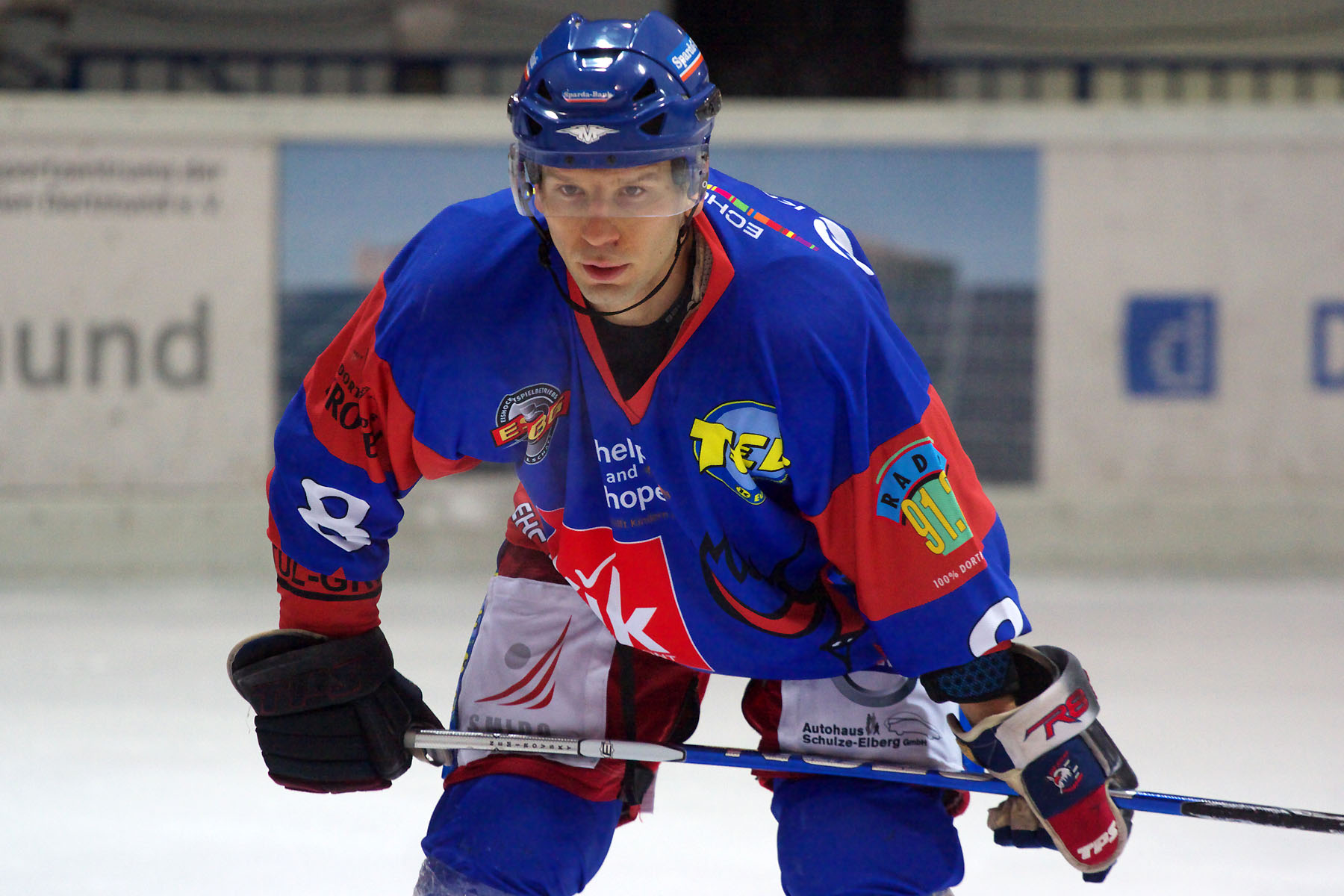
- Mikhail Nemirovsky
- Born: September 30, 1974 (age 52) Odesa, Ukraine
- Height: 5 ft 11 in (180 cm)
- Weight: 190 lb (86 kg; 13 st 8 lb)
- Position: Right wing
- Shoots: left
- Bayernliga team Former teams: EC Bad Kissingen; EC Hannover Indians; Heilbronner Falken; ETC Crimmitschau; Dresdner Eislöwen; Sibir Novosibirsk; China Dragon
- Playing career: 1992–present
Medal record
Ice hockey
Representing Canada
Maccabiah Games
| Gold medal – first place | 1997 Israel | Ice hockey |

Mikhail Nemirovsky (born September 30, 1974) is a Canadian-German former professional ice hockey player who played for EC Bad Kissingen of the German Bayernliga.

He plays right wing, and is 5'11" / 180 cm tall, and weighs 196 lbs / 89 kg. He was born in Odesa, Ukraine. He is a brother of hockey player David Nemirovsky.

He was drafted in 1991 in the OHL in round 7, #103, by the Sudbury Wolves. Nemirovsky played in the Russian Superleague for HC Spartak Moscow and HC Sibir Novosibirsk, the Deutsche Eishockey Liga for the Hannover Scorpions and the American Hockey League for the Fredericton Canadiens. He also played for the Newmarket Royals, Tallahassee Tiger Sharks, Hampton Roads Admirals, Flint Generals, Fort Wayne Komets, Madison Monsters, Charlotte Checkers, New Orleans Brass, Madison Kodiaks, Adirondack IceHawks, Muskegon Fury, Port Huron Border Cats, El Paso Buzzards and Colorado Gold Kings.

He played for Team Canada in the 1997 Maccabiah Games in Israel, winning a gold medal.

== Career statistics ==
| | | | Regular season | | | | | Playoffs |
| Season | Team | League | GP | G | A | Pts | PIM | GP | G | A | Pts | PIM |
|---|---|---|---|---|---|---|---|---|---|---|---|---|
| 1991–92 | Ajax Axemen | COJHL | 3 | 1 | 3 | 4 | 2 | — | — | — | — | — |
| 1991–92 | Weston Dukes | MetJAHL | 20 | 5 | 6 | 11 | 40 | — | — | — | — | — |
| 1991–92 | Pickering Panthers | MetJAHL | 12 | 6 | 8 | 14 | 32 | — | — | — | — | — |
| 1992–93 | HC Spartak Moscow | Russia | 13 | 1 | 0 | 1 | 2 | — | — | — | — | — |
| 1992–93 | HC CSKA Moscow-2 | Russia2 | 1 | 0 | 0 | 0 | 0 | — | — | — | — | — |
| 1993–94 | HC Spartak Moscow | Russia | 8 | 0 | 0 | 0 | 12 | — | — | — | — | — |
| 1993–94 | Newmarket Royals | OHL | 6 | 1 | 1 | 2 | 2 | — | — | — | — | — |
| 1993–94 | Chicoutimi Saguenéens | QMJHL | 24 | 5 | 8 | 13 | 28 | — | — | — | — | — |
| 1994–95 | Tallahassee Tiger Sharks | ECHL | 6 | 0 | 2 | 2 | 0 | — | — | — | — | — |
| 1994–95 | Hampton Roads Admirals | ECHL | 29 | 6 | 14 | 20 | 33 | 4 | 2 | 0 | 2 | 4 |
| 1995–96 | Flint Generals | CoHL | 65 | 29 | 52 | 81 | 121 | 14 | 5 | 10 | 15 | 10 |
| 1996–97 | Fort Wayne Komets | IHL | 16 | 2 | 4 | 6 | 18 | — | — | — | — | — |
| 1996–97 | Fredericton Canadiens | AHL | 7 | 1 | 0 | 1 | 0 | — | — | — | — | — |
| 1996–97 | Madison Monsters | CoHL | 18 | 7 | 15 | 22 | 22 | — | — | — | — | — |
| 1996–97 | Flint Generals | CoHL | 3 | 0 | 5 | 5 | 2 | 9 | 4 | 5 | 9 | 24 |
| 1997–98 | New Orleans Brass | ECHL | 43 | 19 | 22 | 41 | 55 | — | — | — | — | — |
| 1997–98 | Charlotte Checkers | ECHL | 25 | 7 | 17 | 24 | 40 | — | — | — | — | — |
| 1998–99 | Flint Generals | UHL | 40 | 17 | 16 | 33 | 28 | — | — | — | — | — |
| 1998–99 | Bracknell Bees | BISL | 12 | 1 | 3 | 4 | 8 | 7 | 1 | 4 | 5 | 0 |
| 1999–00 | Madison Kodiaks | UHL | 31 | 16 | 17 | 33 | 40 | — | — | — | — | — |
| 1999–00 | Muskegon Fury | UHL | 29 | 11 | 14 | 25 | 44 | — | — | — | — | — |
| 1999–00 | Adirondack IceHawks | UHL | 9 | 3 | 2 | 5 | 6 | 2 | 0 | 0 | 0 | 0 |
| 2000–01 | Colorado Gold Kings | WCHL | 5 | 0 | 2 | 2 | 2 | — | — | — | — | — |
| 2000–01 | Port Huron Border Cats | UHL | 10 | 2 | 3 | 5 | 12 | — | — | — | — | — |
| 2000–01 | El Paso Buzzards | WPHL | 10 | 5 | 10 | 15 | 6 | 7 | 3 | 3 | 6 | 0 |
| 2000–01 | HC Lada Togliatti-2 | Russia3 | 3 | 2 | 1 | 3 | 4 | — | — | — | — | — |
| 2001–02 | Ratinger Ice Aliens | Germany3 | 27 | 21 | 22 | 43 | 79 | — | — | — | — | — |
| 2001–02 | ESV Bayreuth | Germany3 | 18 | 4 | 10 | 14 | 46 | — | — | — | — | — |
| 2002–03 | ERV Schweinfurt | Germany3 | 50 | 37 | 54 | 91 | 163 | 3 | 2 | 2 | 4 | 4 |
| 2003–04 | Mighty Dogs Schweinfurt | Germany3 | 52 | 34 | 56 | 90 | 108 | 2 | 0 | 1 | 1 | 2 |
| 2004–05 | HC Sibir Novosibirsk | Russia | 9 | 2 | 1 | 3 | 8 | — | — | — | — | — |
| 2004–05 | HC Sibir Novosibirsk-2 | Russia3 | 2 | 0 | 1 | 1 | 8 | — | — | — | — | — |
| 2004–05 | Hannover Scorpions | DEL | 18 | 1 | 1 | 2 | 8 | — | — | — | — | — |
| 2004–05 | Nottingham Panthers | EIHL | 1 | 0 | 0 | 0 | 0 | 9 | 3 | 2 | 5 | 8 |
| 2005–06 | Dresdner Eislöwen | Germany2 | 52 | 16 | 34 | 50 | 72 | 9 | 2 | 2 | 4 | 18 |
| 2006–07 | ETC Crimmitschau | Germany2 | 45 | 12 | 17 | 29 | 70 | — | — | — | — | — |
| 2007–08 | Mighty Dogs Schweinfurt | Germany4 | 29 | 22 | 56 | 78 | 46 | 7 | 3 | 8 | 11 | 96 |
| 2008–09 | Heilbronner Falken | Germany2 | 31 | 4 | 6 | 10 | 18 | — | — | — | — | — |
| 2008–09 | Hannover Indians | Germany3 | 4 | 2 | 2 | 4 | 0 | — | — | — | — | — |
| 2009–10 | China Dragon | Asia League | 20 | 10 | 7 | 17 | 44 | — | — | — | — | — |
| 2009–10 | EHC Dortmund | Germany3 | 19 | 4 | 14 | 18 | 14 | 9 | 3 | 6 | 9 | 10 |
| 2010–11 | Mighty Dogs Schweinfurt | Germany4 | 27 | 14 | 23 | 37 | 90 | 10 | 9 | 9 | 18 | 24 |
| 2011–12 | Mighty Dogs Schweinfurt | Germany4 | 29 | 15 | 42 | 57 | 60 | 10 | 5 | 8 | 13 | 20 |
| 2012–13 | Mighty Dogs Schweinfurt | Germany3 | 26 | 9 | 30 | 39 | 30 | — | — | — | — | — |
| 2013–14 | Mighty Dogs Schweinfurt | Germany3 | 41 | 13 | 44 | 57 | 73 | — | — | — | — | — |
| 2014–15 | EC Bad Kissingen | Germany5 | — | — | — | — | — | — | — | — | — | — |
| 2015–16 | EC Bad Kissingen | Germany5 | — | — | — | — | — | — | — | — | — | — |
| 2016–17 | EC Bad Kissingen | Germany5 | 14 | 9 | 36 | 45 | 32 | — | — | — | — | — |
| 2017–18 | EC Bad Kissingen | Germany5 | 9 | 1 | 10 | 11 | 18 | 11 | 4 | 12 | 16 | 6 |
| 2018–19 | EC Bad Kissingen | Germany4 | 26 | 7 | 34 | 41 | 56 | — | — | — | — | — |
| 2019–20 | EC Bad Kissingen | Germany4 | 11 | 4 | 10 | 14 | 8 | — | — | — | — | — |
| 2019–20 | Höchstadter EC | Germany3 | 14 | 1 | 2 | 3 | 16 | — | — | — | — | — |
| AHL totals | | | 7 | 1 | 0 | 1 | 0 | — | — | — | — | — |
| ECHL totals | | | 103 | 32 | 55 | 87 | 128 | 4 | 2 | 0 | 2 | 4 |
| Russia totals | | | 30 | 3 | 1 | 4 | 22 | — | — | — | — | — |
| DEL totals | | | 18 | 1 | 1 | 2 | 8 | — | — | — | — | — |
