= Steve McKenna =

Canadian ice hockey player (born 1973)

- Born: August 21, 1973 (age 52) Toronto, Ontario, Canada
- Height: 6 ft 8 in (203 cm)
- Weight: 252 lb (114 kg; 18 st 0 lb)
- Position: Left wing
- Shot: Left
- Played for: NHL; Los Angeles Kings; Minnesota Wild; New York Rangers; Pittsburgh Penguins; Serie A HC Alleghe; EIHL; Nottingham Panthers; ALH; High1; Kangwon Land; China Sharks; AIHL; Adelaide Avalanche
- NHL draft: Undrafted
- Playing career: 1996–2010

Steve McKenna (born August 21, 1973) is a Canadian former professional ice hockey player who played both defense and left wing. He was a veteran of eight seasons in the NHL. McKenna is currently a constable with the Waterloo Regional Police Service in Waterloo Region, Ontario.

== Playing career ==
McKenna grew up playing minor hockey in his hometown of Hespeler, Ontario. He played the majority of his minor hockey career for the Hespeler Shamrocks of the OMHA before playing Jr.B. for the Cambridge Winterhawks of the OHA in 1991–92.

The following season, McKenna headed west to play Tier II Jr.A. hockey for the Notre Dame Hounds in 1992–93.

After three seasons at Merrimack College, McKenna made his professional debut with the Phoenix Roadrunners of the International Hockey League in 1996. He joined the Los Angeles Kings of the NHL during the 1996–97 season, appearing in nine games. He was an NHL left winger.

McKenna appeared in 137 games with the Kings over four seasons before entering the 2000 NHL Expansion Draft and being selected by the Minnesota Wild with the 37th overall pick. After appearing in 20 games with the Wild, he was traded to the Pittsburgh Penguins on January 13, 2001, in exchange for Roman Simicek. McKenna joined the New York Rangers for the 2001–02 season before returning to the Penguins for the two seasons following that.

During the 2004–05 NHL lockout, there was a great demand for players like him so he played for the Nottingham Panthers of the Elite Ice Hockey League (Great Britain) and the Adelaide Avalanche of the AIHL (Australia).. In 2005–06, he joined Alleghe of the Italian Serie A and later in 2006, he played for Kangwon Land in the Asia League, giving him the rare distinction of playing on four different continents. McKenna played in the Asia League until the completion of the 2008–09 season, where he played for High1 from 2007 to 2008 and the China Sharks in 2008–09. McKenna led all defensemen with eleven points, and briefly played with former NHL star Claude Lemieux before Lemieux returned to the Worcester Sharks.

McKenna finished his career with the CSK VVS Samara (ice hockey) (Central Sports Club Of The Air Force, Samara) of the Russian Major League in 2009–10, scoring three points in ten games.

== Coaching and later career ==
On August 16, 2006, Ice Hockey Australia announced that McKenna had been appointed as coach of the Mighty Roos, Australia's national team. During his time with the Avalanche in the AIHL, McKenna "fell in love with the Australian culture and climate and now wishes to make Australia his home."

McKenna's official tenure as coach of the Mighty Roos started out in 2007, after McKenna completed his playing season with Kangwon Land. He coached the team during their World Championships campaign that year. McKenna coached Australia to gaining a promotion to Division I during his first season at the helm of Mighty Roos.

McKenna was the head coach of HC Alleghe, a Serie A1 hockey team from 2009 until 2012. He later became the general manager of HC Alleghe, holding the position during the 2012–13 season.

McKenna subsequently became a Waterloo Regional Police Service constable.

== Covid-19 vaccination protest ==
In October, 2021, McKenna publicly requested that the city of Cambridge remove his jersey from display in the Hespeler arena because of Ontario's policy of barring people who were not vaccinated against COVID-19 to enter municipal recreation facilities. McKenna had previously donated his Los Angeles Kings team jersey to the arena. Said McKenna, "I can’t enter the very arena where my jersey hangs on the wall."

== Career statistics ==
=== Regular season and playoffs ===
			Regular season					Playoffs
Season	Team	League	GP	G	A	Pts	PIM	GP	G	A	Pts	PIM
1991–92	Cambridge Winter Hawks	MWJHL	48	21	23	44	173	—	—	—	—	—
1992–93	Notre Dame Hounds	SJHL	49	14	23	37	162	—	—	—	—	—
1993–94	Merrimack College	HE	37	1	2	3	74	—	—	—	—	—
1994–95	Merrimack College	HE	37	1	9	10	74	—	—	—	—	—
1995–96	Merrimack College	HE	33	3	11	14	67	—	—	—	—	—
1996–97	Phoenix Roadrunners	IHL	66	6	5	11	187	—	—	—	—	—
1996–97	Los Angeles Kings	NHL	9	0	0	0	37	—	—	—	—	—
1997–98	Fredericton Canadiens	AHL	6	2	1	3	48	—	—	—	—	—
1997–98	Los Angeles Kings	NHL	62	4	4	8	150	3	0	1	1	8
1998–99	Los Angeles Kings	NHL	20	1	0	1	36	—	—	—	—	—
1999–00	Los Angeles Kings	NHL	46	0	5	5	125	—	—	—	—	—
2000–01	Minnesota Wild	NHL	20	1	1	2	19	—	—	—	—	—
2000–01	Pittsburgh Penguins	NHL	34	0	0	0	100	—	—	—	—	—
2001–02	Hartford Wolf Pack	AHL	3	0	0	0	11	—	—	—	—	—
2001–02	New York Rangers	NHL	54	2	1	3	144	—	—	—	—	—
2002–03	Pittsburgh Penguins	NHL	54	2	1	3	128	—	—	—	—	—
2003–04	Pittsburgh Penguins	NHL	70	9	1	10	85	—	—	—	—	—
2004–05	Nottingham Panthers	EIHL	28	5	6	11	22	—	—	—	—	—
2005	Adelaide Avalanche	AIHL	19	3	16	19	36	—	—	—	—	—
2005–06	HC Alleghe	ITA	42	7	8	15	84	4	1	0	1	10
2006–07	Kangwon Land	ALIH	33	5	18	23	18	6	0	0	0	6
2007–08	High1	ALIH	30	2	11	13	64	3	1	0	1	0
2008–09	China Sharks	ALIH	36	1	10	11	56	—	—	—	—	—
2009–10	CSK VVS Samara	RUS-2	10	2	1	3	6	—	—	—	—	—
NHL totals			373	18	14	32	824	3	0	1	1	8
