= China Dragon =

- City: Harbin, Qiqihar and Shanghai
- League: Asia League Ice Hockey (2007–2017)
- Founded: 2007; 19 years ago
- Operated: 2007–2017
- Home arena: Sports Center Pavilion, Harbin
- Colors: Red, yellow

Franchise history
- 2004–2006: Qiqihar
- 2006–2007: Changchun Fuao
- 2004–2006: Harbin
- 2006–2007: Hosa
- 2007–2009: China Sharks
- 2009–2017: China Dragon

China Dragon
- Traditional Chinese: 中國龍隊
- Simplified Chinese: 中国龙队
Transcriptions
Standard Mandarin
- Hanyu Pinyin: Zhōngguó Lóngdùn
- IPA: [ʈʂʊ́ŋkwǒ lʊ̌ŋtwə̂n]

The China Dragon (Chinese: 中国龙队) was a professional ice hockey team which played its home games in three cities in China, including Harbin, Qiqihar, and Shanghai. The team was a member of Asia League Ice Hockey between 2007 and 2017. The team was formed in 1954 as two clubs, Harbin and Qiqihar, as part of the China League. In 2004, the clubs joined Asia League Ice Hockey and in 2007 they merged into a single club, China Sharks, backed by the National Hockey League's San Jose Sharks for financial reasons. The team was renamed the China Dragon in 2009 when San Jose pulled out. The team was dissolved following the 2016–17 Asia League Ice Hockey season, after which KHL club Kunlun Red Star became the primary Chinese ice hockey team.

== History ==
The China Dragon began their history as two separate teams, both playing in China.

=== Qiqihar ===
Qiqihar Ice hockey team was founded in 1954 and captured 28 championships in the China League. Their mascot was the snow leopard. The team joined Asia League Ice Hockey in the 2004–2005 season. They played out of the Qiqihar Gymnasium. The season was opened in the two Chinese rinks. They played 42 games in their initial season only winning a single game and finished in last place with four points. Their only win came against fellow Chinese team, Harbin. They gave up a staggering 326 goals while only managing to score 53. Fu Nan led his team in scoring with eight goals. Liu Henan had eight assists and 14 points. The team also gave up the most short handed goals while being the only team who didn't score any. The team rotated coaches from game to game rather than have a single coach lead the team for the season. The team had three import players on the roster, but only two of them each played a single game during the season.

As part of the Nordic Vikings entry into the league, Qiqihar sent three players to play on their team for the 2005–2006 season. In return, the Vikings provided three players, a coach and an official to Qiqihar. While improving on their first year's showing, the team still finished in last place with 11 points. With the schedule reduced to 38 games, the team gave up 278 goals while scoring 61. Their success came mainly against Harbin, but they managed an overtime loss to Kangwon Land from South Korea who were playing in their first season. The team stopped fielding their Swedish exchange players after their November 28, 2005 game against Anyang Halla. However, Anders Westerlund continued to coach the team until the end of the season. The team was led in scoring by Jayden Der with 11 goals and 15 points. Guo Xin had the most assists with nine. For the second year in a row the team gave up the most short handed goals while being the only team not to score one.

There were several changes to the team in the 2006–2007 season. The Nordic Vikings left the league which means the player and staff that were exchanged were no longer available to them. The team also gained new sponsorship. Their name was changed to "Changchun Fuao" and they moved to Changchun, the future site of the 2007 Asian Winter Games. The league reduced the number of games played to 34. Changchun Fuao slid backwards from the previous season and only won two games. Both wins came against Hose, formerly Harbin, and they finished with six points. On December 3, Changchun was involved in a bench-clearing brawl against the Nikko Ice Bucks. Five Ice Bucks players received game misconduct penalties while seven Changchun players received the same and one Changchun player, Fu Nan, received a match penalty. The league later suspended all of the penalized players for one game, except for Fu who received a two-game suspension. Lie Henan again led the team with 20 points and also led scoring with 13. Fu Nan led with nine assists. Fuao did improve in the short handed goals department. They gave up the most of any team, but managed to score six during the season which put them ahead of the Nikko Ice Bucks who only scored three. With the departure of their year-long coach from Sweden, the team was back to switching coaches during the season. Due to financial difficulty the team merged with Hosa at the end of the 2006–2007 season to form the China Sharks.

=== Harbin ===
Like Qiqihar, Harbin Ice hockey team was also founded in 1954 and took part in the China League. They had the most championship wins in Chinese hockey. Harbin took their name from Harbin City and played out of the Harbin Ice Hockey Rink. They joined Asia League Ice Hockey in the 2004–2005 season. In their first season of 42 games they finished in seventh place with 26 points. They had seven wins, including two against the Nikko Ice Bucks. They scored 91 goals while allowing 225. Unlike Qiqihar, Harbin used import players on their team. Tomas Hruby finished sixth in the league and led the team with 23 goals, 19 assists and 42 points. Harbin also led the league in short handed goals with nine. Captain Yin Kai was absent from two games on December 4 and 7 during which time the team played with no captain on the ice. On December 11, 2004 Wang Dahai began filling the position of captain. In contrast to Qiqihar, Harbin maintained the same coach through the season.

In their second season, 2005–2006, Harbin again won seven of their 38 games. Including three games against new Korean entry, Kangwon Land. They scored 68 goals while allowing 198. They also received three players, a coach and official from the Nordic Vikings organization. The Swedish coach took over for the year and their coach from the previous year worked as an assistant coach. Yin Kai returned to the Harbin line-up on November 23, 2005 and after a couple of games he resumed the position of captain on December 1. Harbin removed the Swedish players from their roster after the December 13 game against the Nippon Paper Cranes. Du Chao was the team leader with 13 goals and 18 points. Wang Dahai recorded 13 assists. After the previous year's strong showing in short handed goals, Harbin finished near the bottom with only 2.

Harbin was sponsored by the Hosa sporting goods company in the 2006–2007 season. As part of the sponsorship deal the team moved to Beijing and changed their name to Hosa. It was announced that they would still play some home games in Harbin. Their new home was the Hosa Skating Center. Of the 34 games that Hosa played they won six and finished in seventh place with 19 points, scoring 86 goals while allowing 188. They were swept by three of the four Japanese teams. With the departure of their Swedish imports, Hosa brought Tomas Hruby back to the roster. He led the team with 22 goals again finishing sixth in the league. Juri Hubacek finished sixth in assists with 35 and eight in points overall with 51. Hruby finished in eighth place with 50 points. For the second time in their three-year history in the league the team was leading in the league in short handed goals, tied for 10 with two other teams. The team played six of their 17 home games in Harbin. At the end of the season they merged with Chanchun Fuao to form the China Sharks.

=== China Sharks ===
Under the management of the Chinese Ice Hockey Association, players were selected from the two teams to form the new team, originally sponsored by Hosa Sports. As a result of negotiation between the Chinese Association and the San Jose Sharks, the NHL team agreed to send five players and three coaches to the Chinese team, in exchange for the team naming rights. The team's logo is similar to the Cleveland Barons, a previous affiliate of the Sharks.

By merging the only two professional hockey clubs in China, the China Sharks essentially became the Chinese national team which would compete in the Asia League Ice Hockey and eventually in the Olympics. The parent company of the San Jose Sharks, Silicon Valley Sports and Entertainment, made a decision to send players and coaches to China prior to the 2007–08 season in support.

The partnership between the San Jose Sharks and China's national team happened largely through the work of China Sharks' GM Chris Collins. While working for the San Jose Sharks, Collins investigated China's athletic market and was able to convince San Jose Sharks' President Greg Jamison that the club should invest in China. After the partnership became official, Collins soon moved to China and became GM of the new club. The team now has two major offices in Shanghai which employ marketing and operations professionals.

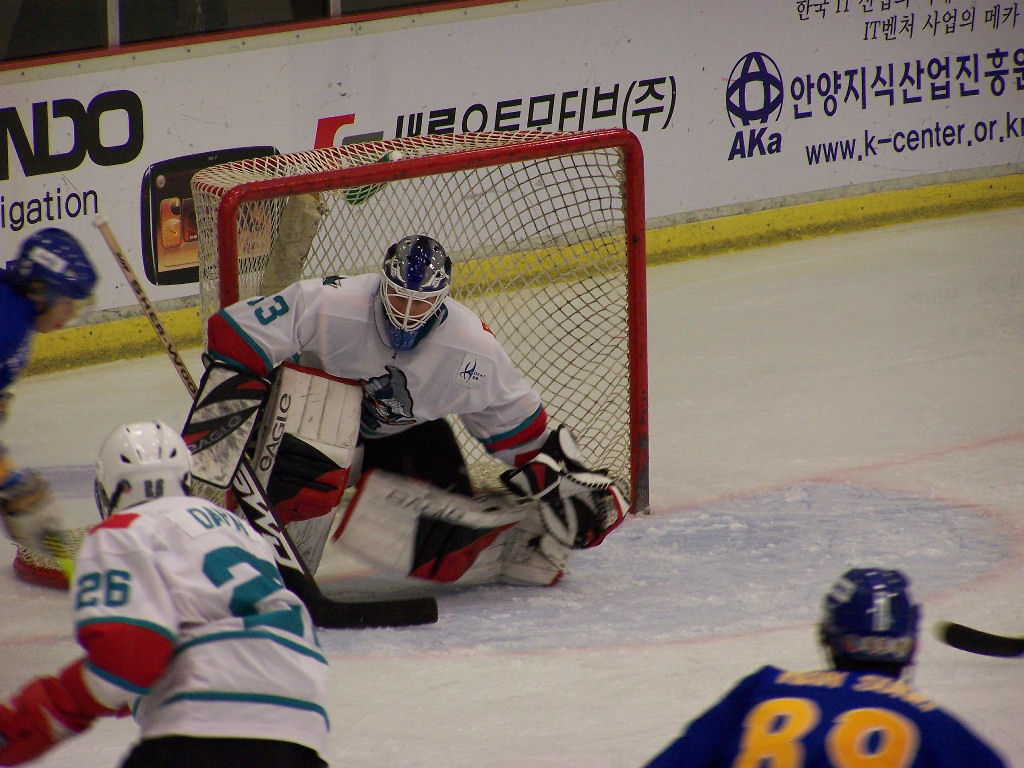
China Sharks goalie Wade Flaherty prepares to make a stop in a game against the Anyang Halla on November 15, 2008. Flaherty is wearing the team's away jersey.

Though the team played its first season in Beijing, it moved into a new arena called Songjiang Stadium in the Songjiang District of Shanghai for the 2008–09 season. On October 11, 2008, the China Sharks played the first home game in their new arena, beating the Seibu Prince Rabbits by a score of 3–1. Prior to this, the team held its 2008–09 training camp in the northern Chinese city of Suihua. Also before the 2008–09 season, three China Sharks players trained in the United States at the San Jose Sharks rookie training camp in Oakland, California. Cui Zhinan, Lui Heenan, and Wang Jiang, all came to spread awareness of the team and skate with the club each afternoon. The men stayed for different periods of time, with some staying as long as ten days.

The San Jose Sharks' decision to partner with the Chinese national team was not the first initiative by an NHL team to spread hockey into Asia. In 2006, the New York Islanders helped launch Project Hope, an initiative which included building several rinks, providing hockey equipment, coaching, and providing English classes to those living in the Heilongjiang Province of China. Like the New York Islanders, the San Jose Sharks plan to work with the Chinese government and local investors to build youth and industrial leagues across China. Also a part of this plan would be to help develop rinks and other hockey venues to encourage the game. While the game has been somewhat popular in northern China, the game is relatively unknown in southern parts of the country. Part of these initiatives will be to help spread hockey throughout all of China. At the current time, the New York Islanders and the San Jose Sharks are the only two NHL teams with a presence in China.

The China Sharks' eventual goal is to prepare its young Chinese players to eventually compete in the winter Olympics. However, the level of play in China is still significantly lower than in other countries. In 2008–09, the China Sharks finished near the bottom of the Asia League Ice Hockey, winning only five of their thirty-six regular-season games.

=== China Dragon (2009–2017) ===
The team was renamed the China Dragon in 2009 when San Jose pulled out its financial backing.

In the 2008–09 season, the Dragon was making limited progress: they won seven of their 36 contests, good enough for 23 points, three more than the last-place Nikkō Ice Bucks of Japan. In 2009–10, however, China managed only one win – the only victory the club would get in their next five seasons, a span of 192 matches. Dragon would compile an imperfect record in 2013–14, losing all 42 matches in regulation and being outscored 340–58.

Dragon snapped their long losing streak on September 23, 2014, with a 4–3 overtime win over High1. Brett Parnham scored a hat-trick, including the game-winner. China finished the 2014–15 season still deep in last place, but they did manage eight wins on the season against 40 defeats. In 2015–16, Dragon's record was about the same, seven wins in 48 matches and another last-place finish; Brett Parnham's 21 goals was good enough to place in the AIHL top 10.

China Dragon was dissolved following the 2016–2017 season, leaving the just-created KHL club Kunlun Red Star as the premier ice hockey club in China. In Dragon's ten years of existence, they played 402 matches and won only 33 (21 in regulation, eight in overtime and four in shootouts) while losing 369 (349 in regulation and ten each in overtime and shootouts) for an .082 winning percentage.

== Year-by-year record ==
complete records for previous seasons

=== Qiqihar (AL Hockey 2004–2007) ===
| Season | GP | W | W(OT) | T | L(OT) | L | GF | GA | PTS | Finish | Playoffs |
|---|---|---|---|---|---|---|---|---|---|---|---|
| 2004–05 | 42 | 1 | 0 | 0 | 1 | 40 | 53 | 326 | 4 | 8th/8 | – |
| 2005–06 | 38 | 3 | 0 | 1 | 1 | 33 | 61 | 278 | 11 | 9th/9 | – |
| 2006–07 | 34 | 2 | 0 | 0 | 0 | 32 | 41 | 235 | 6 | 8th/8 | – |
| Totals | 114 | 6 | 0 | 1 | 2 | 105 | 155 | 839 | – | – | – |

=== Harbin (AL Hockey 2004–2007) ===
| Season | GP | W | W(OT) | T | L(OT) | L | GF | GA | PTS | Finish | Playoffs |
|---|---|---|---|---|---|---|---|---|---|---|---|
| 2004–05 | 42 | 7 | 2 | 1 | 0 | 32 | 91 | 225 | 26 | 7th/8 | – |
| 2005–06 | 38 | 7 | 1 | 1 | 0 | 29 | 68 | 198 | 24 | 8th/9 | – |
| 2006–07 | 34 | 6 | 0 | 0 | 1 | 27 | 86 | 188 | 19 | 7th/8 | – |
| Totals | 114 | 20 | 3 | 2 | 1 | 88 | 245 | 611 | – | – | – |

=== China Dragon (AL Hockey 2007–2017) ===
| Season | GP | W | W(OT) | W(GWS)* | T | L(GWS)* | L(OT) | L | GF | GA | PTS | Finish | Playoffs |
|---|---|---|---|---|---|---|---|---|---|---|---|---|---|
| 2007–08 | 30 | 3 | 0 | — | 0 | — | 1 | 26 | 63 | 159 | 10 | 7th/7 | – |
| 2008–09 | 36 | 5 | 1 | 1 | — | 3 | 1 | 25 | 60 | 129 | 23 | 6th/7 | – |
| 2009–10 | 36 | 1 | 0 | 0 | — | 0 | 0 | 35 | 64 | 218 | 3 | 7th/7 | – |
| 2010–11 | 36 | 0 | 0 | 0 | — | 1 | 1 | 34 | 46 | 248 | 2 | 7th/7 | – |
| 2011–12 | 36 | 0 | 0 | 0 | — | 0 | 1 | 35 | 53 | 251 | 1 | 7th/7 | – |
| 2012–13 | 42 | 0 | 0 | 0 | — | 1 | 1 | 40 | 67 | 297 | 2 | 7th/7 | – |
| 2013–14 | 42 | 0 | 0 | 0 | — | 0 | 0 | 42 | 58 | 340 | 0 | 8th/8 | – |
| 2014–15 | 48 | 5 | 1 | 2 | — | 1 | 1 | 38 | 116 | 248 | 23 | 9th/9 | – |
| 2015–16 | 48 | 3 | 3 | 1 | — | 2 | 3 | 36 | 105 | 247 | 22 | 9th/9 | – |
| 2016–17 | 48 | 4 | 3 | 0 | — | 2 | 1 | 38 | 106 | 274 | 21 | 9th/9 | – |
| Totals | 402 | 21 | 8 | 4 | 0 | 10 | 10 | 349 | 738 | 2411 | 107 | – | – |

*prior to the 2008–09 season, there were no shoot-outs and games ended in a tie

== Team leaders ==
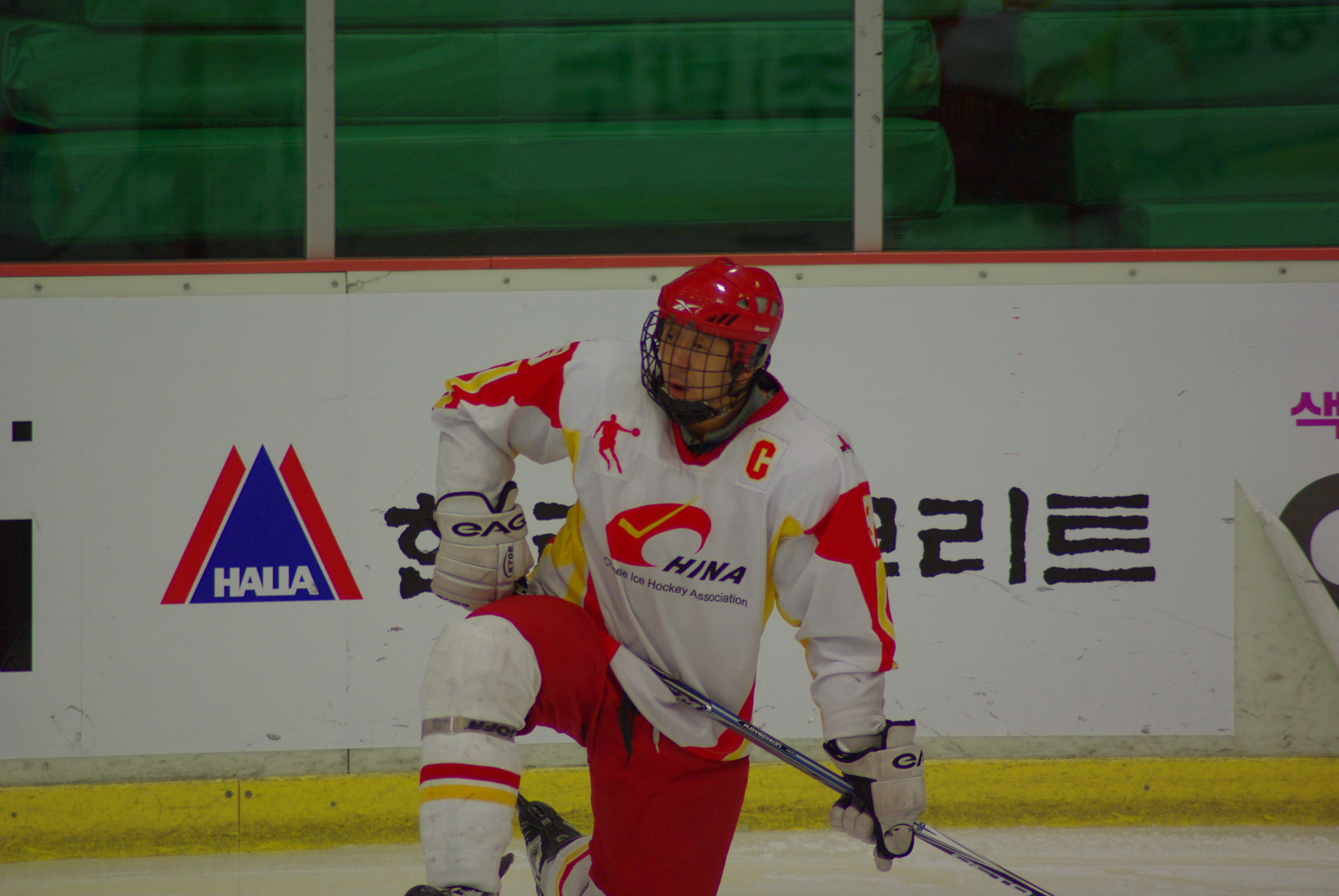
Wang Dahai was one of two captains for Hosa and was also a captain of China Dragon

=== Qiqihar ===
| Captains | | Coaches | |
| Player | Season | Coach | Season |
|---|---|---|---|
| Liu Wen | 2004–2006 | Varied | 2004–2005 |
| Liu Wen | 2004–2006 | Anders Westerlund | 2005–2006 |
| Zhou Yudi | 2006–2007 | Varied | 2006–2007 |

=== Harbin ===
| Captains | | Coaches | |
| Player | Season | Coach | Season |
|---|---|---|---|
| Yin Kai | 2004 | Wang Guocheng | 2004–2005 |
| Wang Dahai | 2004–2005 | Yari Armas Koskinen | 2005–2006 |
| Yin Kai | 2005–2007 | Wang Benyu | 2006–2007 |

=== China Dragon ===
Captains
| Player | Season |
|---|---|
| Zhou Yudi | 2007–2008 |
| Adam Taylor | 2008–2009 |
| Wang Dahai | 2009–2010 |
| Zhang Weiyang | 2010–2012 |
| Shūji Kikuchi | 2013–2014 |
| Bin Ishioka | 2014–2015 |
| Wang Chongwei | 2016–2017 |

Coaches
| Coach | Season |
|---|---|
| Derek Eisler | 2007–2009 |
| Andrei Kovalev | 2009–2010 |
| Evgeny Lebedev | 2010–2011 |
| Keisuke Araki | 2011–2015 |
| Jeff Hutchins | 2015–2017 |

== Import players ==
- (Russia) Fedower Commidatolv 2004–05, F
- (Czech Republic) Lukas Dvorak 2004–05, D
- (Czech Republic) Tomas Hruby 2004–05, 2006–07, F
- (Russia) Demitory Silimarch 2004–05, F
- (Czech Republic) Kamil Stastny 2004–05, F
- (Canada) Jayden Der 2005–06, F
- (Czech Republic) Robert Horak 2006–07, D
- (Czech Republic) Jiri Hubacek 2006–07, F
- (United States) Jason Beeman 2007–09, RW
- (Canada) Kelly Guard 2007–08, G
- (Canada) Kevin Korol 2007–09, C/LW
- (Canada) Dan Knapp 2007–08, D
- (Canada) Keegan McAvoy 2007–08, LW/RW
- (United States) Zach Sikich 2007–08, G
- (Canada) Kevin Du 2008–09, RW
- (Canada) Wade Flaherty 2008–09, G/Assistant Coach (former Sharks/Islanders/Lightning/Panthers/Predators)
- (Canada) Claude Lemieux 2008–09, RW (former Canadiens/Devils/Avalanche/Coyotes/Stars/Sharks)
- (Canada) Steve McKenna 2008–09, D/Assistant Coach (former Kings/Wild/Penguins/Rangers)
- (Canada) Adam Taylor 2008–09, LW
- (Russia) Mikhail Nemirovsky 2009, RW
- (Slovakia) Matus Kadraba 2009–10, RW
- (Slovakia) Marek Kanich 2009–10, RW
- (Slovakia) Juraj Strapak 2009–10, LW
- (Russia) Alexey Abramov 2010–11, G
- (Belarus) Vadzim Navitski 2010–11, D
- (Belarus) Sergei Paklin 2010–11, D
- (Belarus) Artsiom Karkotski 2010–11, FW
- (Belarus) Dmitriy Dudik 2010–11, FW
- (Belarus) Aliaksandr Koushyk 2010–11, FW
- (Canada) Rob McFeeters 2012–13, LW
- (Canada) Rob Jarvis 2012–13, D
- (Canada) Matthew Glasser 2012–13, LW
- (Canada) Ryan Burkholder 2012–13, D
- (Canada) Michael Budd 2013–14, F
- (Russia) Roman Pantyukhov, 2013–14, D
- (United States) Miles Beason, 2013–14, RW
- (United States) Rick Soo, 2013–14, F
- (Canada) Brett Parnham 2013–16, C
- (United States) Alex Westlund, 2014–15, G
- (United States) Evan Stoflet, 2014–16, D
- (Finland) Matti Näätänen, 2015–17, D
- (Canada) Scott Barney 2016–17, C/RW
- (United States) Kevin Quick, 2016–17, D
