= 2014–15 Asia League Ice Hockey season =

2014–15 Asia League Ice Hockey
- League: Asia League Ice Hockey
- Sport: ice hockey
- Duration: 6 September 2014 – 24 March 2015
- Number of teams: 9

Regular season
- Season champions: (South Korea) Anyang Halla
- Top scorer: (Japan) Hiroki Ueno (40+40=80p)

Playoffs
- Finals champions: (Japan) Tohoku Free Blades

Asia League Ice Hockey seasons
- ← 2013–14 2015–16 →

The 2014–15 Asia League Ice Hockey season was the 12th season of Asia League Ice Hockey, which this season consists of nine teams from China, Japan, Russia, and South Korea. The league was expanded to include one new team, HC Sakhalin, for the season.

== Participating teams ==
The table below reveals participating teams in 2014–15 season, their residence, and when they joined Asia League Ice Hockey.

| Club | City/Area | Joined ALIH |
|---|---|---|
| Nippon Paper Cranes | (Japan) Kushiro | 2003 |
| Anyang Halla | (South Korea) Anyang | 2003 |
| Nikko Ice Bucks | (Japan) Nikkō | 2003 |
| Oji Eagles | (Japan) Tomakomai | 2003 |
| High1 | (South Korea) Chuncheon | 2005 |
| China Dragon | (China) Shanghai | 2007 |
| Tohoku Free Blades | (Japan) Hachinohe | 2009 |
| Daemyung Sangmu | (South Korea) Seoul | 2013 |
| HC Sakhalin | (Russia) Yuzhno-Sakhalinsk | 2014 |

== Regular season ==
The final standing off the regular season is shown below.

| | Teams | GP | W | OTW | SOW | SOL | OTL | L | GF–GA | Pts |
|---|---|---|---|---|---|---|---|---|---|---|
| 1. | Anyang Halla | 48 | 29 | 0 | 2 | 5 | 3 | 9 | 182–111 | 99 |
| 2. | HC Sakhalin | 48 | 26 | 2 | 3 | 1 | 2 | 14 | 180–129 | 91 |
| 3. | Tohoku Free Blades | 48 | 27 | 1 | 2 | 2 | 2 | 14 | 188–131 | 91 |
| 4. | Oji Eagles | 48 | 21 | 2 | 5 | 3 | 3 | 14 | 156–138 | 83 |
| 5. | High1 | 48 | 22 | 1 | 1 | 5 | 1 | 18 | 164–154 | 76 |
| 6. | Nippon Paper Cranes | 48 | 15 | 3 | 6 | 4 | 2 | 18 | 160–157 | 69 |
| 7. | Daemyung Sangmu | 48 | 14 | 3 | 3 | 4 | 0 | 24 | 155–199 | 58 |
| 8. | Nikko Ice Bucks | 48 | 15 | 4 | 1 | 0 | 3 | 25 | 150–184 | 58 |
| 9. | China Dragon | 48 | 5 | 1 | 2 | 1 | 1 | 38 | 116–248 | 23 |

== Play-off ==
Prior to the play-off, the teams placed four and five in the regular season had a pre-qualification, in best out of three games, labeled below as Quarterfinal. The play-off schedule and results are shown below.

Quarterfinals
4 | Oji Eagles | 1
5 | High1 | 2

Semifinals
1 | Anyang Halla | 3
4 | High1 | 0
2 | Sakhalin | 1
3 | Tohoku | 3

Finals
1 | Anyang Halla | 0
2 | Tohoku | 3
