= High1 =

- City: Seoul, South Korea
- Founded: 15 September 2004; 21 years ago
- Dissolved: 2023; 3 years ago
- Home arena: Mokdong Ice Rink
- Colors: Red, black, white
- Owner(s): Kangwon Land Corporation

Franchise history
- 2004–2007: Kangwon Land
- 2007–2023: High1

High1 (Korean: 하이원) was an ice hockey team based in Seoul, South Korea. Formed in 2004, the team was initially made up of players from the defunct Korean Ice Hockey League who didn't immediately move to Anyang Halla from the Hyundai and Dongwon teams as well as other disbanded teams and players who had returned from military service. Prior to the 2007–08 season, the team was known as Kangwon Land (Korean: 강원랜드), named after their owner, Kangwon Land Corporation. Between 2005 and 2019, High1 competed in the Asia League Ice Hockey.

== History ==
Kangwon Land logo

The team was formed as Kangwon Land in 2004, named after the owner. The team was formed with the intention of joining the Asia League and was expected to have an operating cost of 2 billion won. The owners also felt that the team's creation would aid in a bid for the 2014 Winter Olympics. The team's formation was first announced in January 2004. The team hired former Dong-won Dreams head coach, Kim Hee-woo. Their founding ceremony was on 15 September 2004 at COEX. Their first game was held on 5 October 2004 against Korea University as part of the 59th Korean Domestic Championship. They lost their first game by a score of 3–2. However, they finished as runner-up and took third place in the Kangwon Cup in December of the same year. In July 2005 it was announced that Kangwon Land would be admitted to the Asia League. At that time the team also announced that it would spend 46 days in Canada training, including playing 10 games, in preparation for the season.

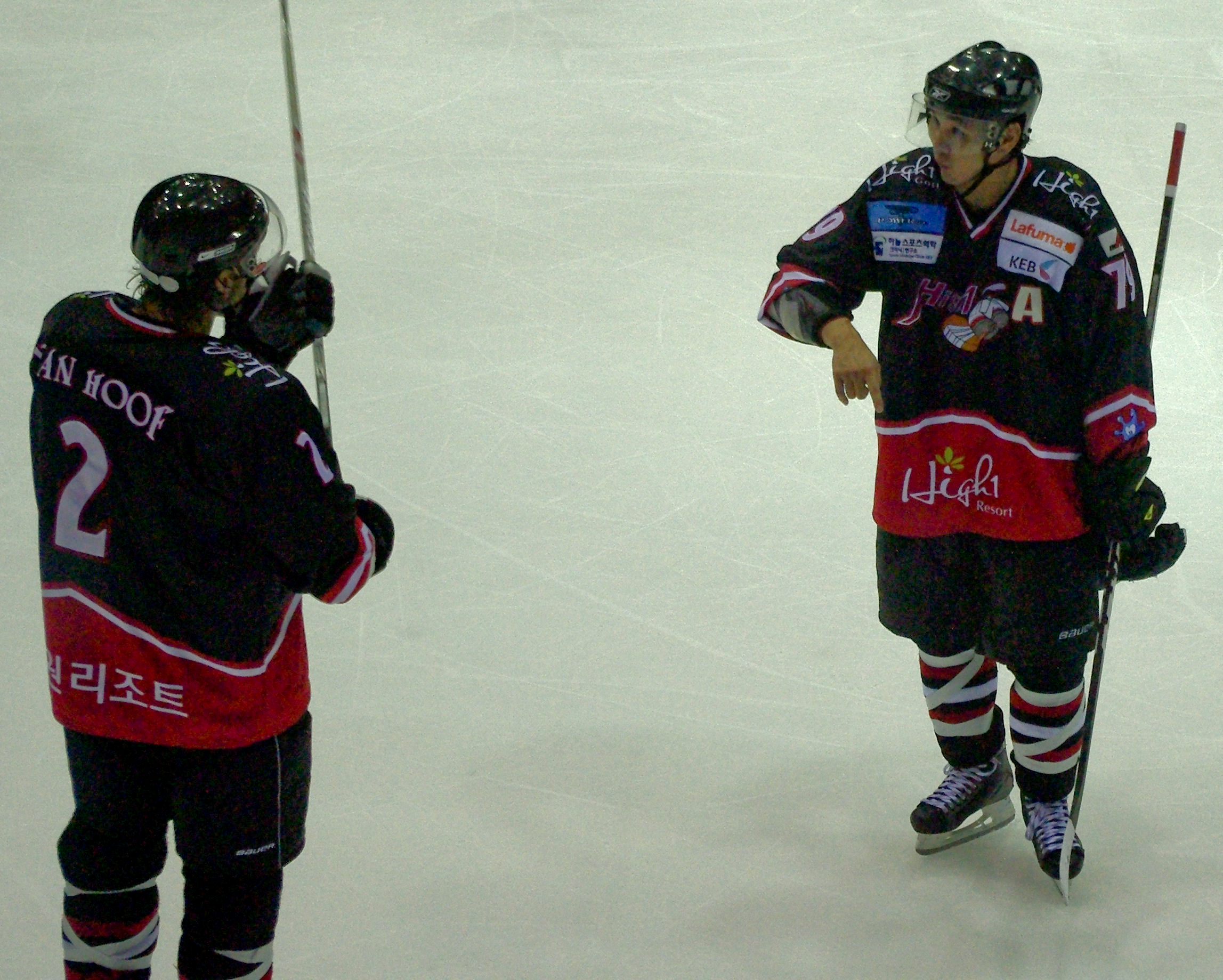
Alex Kim discusses strategy on-ice with Jeremy van Hoof. Kim won two points titles his first year in the league.

Kangwon Land became the second Korean team to enter the Asia League during the 2005–06 season. They played 38 regular season games. All of their 19 home games were played in Chuncheon at the Eui Am ice rink. They were swept in their regular season series against Kokudo and the Nippon Paper Cranes while only managing to win one out of nine games against fellow South Korean team, Halla. They finished in seventh place with 28 points. The team also failed to break the top 10 in any of the point rankings. Joshua Liebenow led the team with 16 goals, Park Jin-hong led with 18 assists and Kim Kyu-hyun led the team with 26 points overall. Hwang Byung-wook led the team in plus-minus with a +3 for the season. Kangwon Land failed to make the playoffs as only the top six teams advanced to the postseason. After the conclusion of the season Kangwon Land played a friendly against North Korea. Kangwon Land won the match by a score of 3 to 1.

In the 2006–07 season the league reduced the number of games played to 34 with the departure of the Nordic Vikings. During the season the team participated in the Korea Domestic Championship and took first place for the first time in their three-year participation. After finishing out of the playoffs in their first season, they finished in fourth place with 62 points and advanced. They also swept their season series against Changchun Fuao and improved on the previous years performance against Halla by only losing a single game to them. The team played in mixed arenas, playing eleven games in Chuncheon, four games in Mok-dong and two games in Goyang. The points race also saw Kangwon Land perform much better. Tim Smith led the leagues in goals with 30 and Kim Kyu-hyun led the team with 38 assists, placed third in the league with 26 goals and 64 points. Kangwon Land had a total of 8 placings in the top 10 for goals, assists and points. Tim Smith also led the team in plus-minus with a +44 The team had to face Halla in the first round of the playoffs. They continued their season long success against them and swept them in three games. Kangwon's sweep of Halla marked the first time a non-Japanese team won a playoff series in the Asia League. After defeating Halla they were swept in three games by the Nippon Paper Cranes in the semi-finals. Even with the early exit from the playoffs, Tim Smith managed a second-place finish in the assists category.

With the two China teams merging into a single one, the league reduced the number of games to only 30 in the 2007–08 season. Prior to the start of the season Kangwon Land changed their name to High1. The team again won the Korea Domestic Championship in November 2007. High1 further improved and finished the season in second place with 58 points which included a sweep of the newly formed China Sharks. Coach Kim credit the entire team for doing well but singled out their goalie, Eum Hyun-seung as really shining. The team's home schedule was not as mixed as the previous season and they played 13 games in Chuncheon while playing two in Goyang. There was further improvement in the point rankings as Alex Kim ranked first in goals, third in assists and first points in the league with 23, 28 and 51 respectively. Tim Smith was tied with Kim for first with 23 goals and finished third in points with 46. The team had three other top 10 showings in the points rankings. Alex Kim also led the team in plus-minus with +32. Finishing in second place had High1 playing the Oji Paper in the semi-finals. Unfortunately for High1 Oji would sweep every series they played that year and capture the cup. Due to their quick exit, High1 failed to register in the postseason points race.

At the start of the 2008–09 season the Asia League increased the number of games played to 36. High1 once again won the Korea Domestic Championship making it their third in a row. While they were enjoying success domestically, they were not able to continue their success of the previous season. High1 finished the season in fifth place with 46 points. They split their season series with Halla at three wins each. The team was backed to playing a mixed home schedule with the majority being played in Goyang. High1 played nine games in Goyang, seven games in Chuncheon and two games in Mokdong. The team also fared poorly in the points race. Alex Kim's league-leading goals from the previous year failed to make a repeat and while he still led the team, he finished in seventh place with 15 goals. Ryan Haruo Kuwabara was tied for ninth place with 25 assists. Kim led with 36 points but it was not good enough for a top-ten finish, he also led the team in plus-minus with a +12. With the top five teams moving on to the playoffs, High1 had to play a three-game series against the fourth-place Cranes. They were defeated in two games, making it three years in a row where they were swept out of the playoffs.

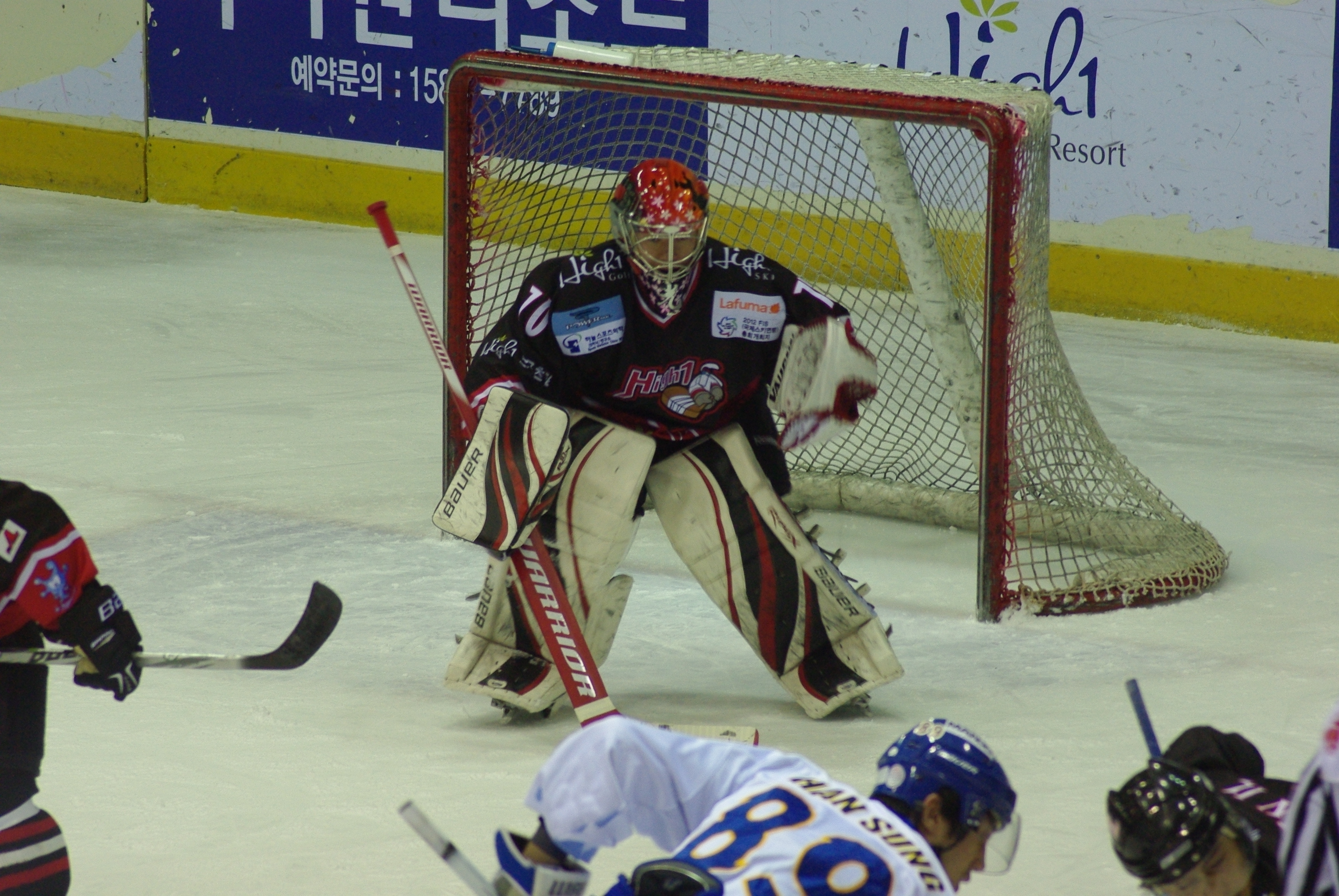
With three new goaltenders in 2010, Mistuaki Inoue became the team's number one, playing in all 36 games.

The league kept the number of games on the schedule at 36 for the 2009–10 season. High1 lost in the semi-finals of the Korea Domestic Championship to Korea University. At the midpoint of the season, High1 was sitting in the middle of the rankings. However, they ranked second in goals scored. At the end of the regular season, High1 finished in fourth place with 60 points. They scored 150 goals while allowing 130 goals and won their season series against the China Dragon and Tohoku Free Blades and lost their series against the Cranes and Eagles. In contrast to the middle of the season when High1 had seven players in the top ten points ranking, they finished with only two players in the top ten. Alex Kim and Tim Smith tied for first place with 75 points. Kim also led the team in goals with 29, while Smith led the team in assists with 48. Kim also led the team in plus-minus with +50. High1 scored the lowest number of shorthanded goals, with only 2. The team played ten of their 18 home games in Goyang. Advancing to the playoffs, they faced Korean rival Halla in the semi-finals. Although they won the first game in Anyang, they lost three straight to be knocked out of the playoffs.

The 2010–11 season saw little change to the make-up or schedule of the league. High1 made significant changes to their defensive side by acquiring three new goalies and four new defencemen. The team also acquired three new forwards. Three of the changes were to the team's, imports with only Tim Smith remaining on the team. High1 faced Halla in the Korea Domestic Championship and lost the game with a score of 5–1. Also in November, one of the team's imports, Alex Bourret left the team to return to Canada, citing concern over the relations between North and South Korea. Even though Bourret played only 16 games, he led the league with 106 minutes in penalties. Hiroki Ueno led the team in plus-minus with a +34 on the season. Ueno Also led the team in goals with 23, which secured him third place in the league rankings. Tim Smith led the team in assists with 29 which allowed him to finish fifth in the league and both Ueno and Smith finished with 45 points overall tying for seventh in the league. High1 finished the season with 51 points and in fifth place, marking the first time that they missed the play-offs since their first year in the league. They won their season series against the Dragon and Ice Bucks, as well as tying the Cranes, but were swept all six games by the Eagles. They finished fourth in goals scored with 131, but allowed the second most goals with 112. The team was ranked fifth on the powerplay but allowed the fewest shorthanded goals of any team, only relinquishing a single goal all season. High1 also ranked fourth on the penalty goal but scored the second most shorthanded goals with five. The team played 13 of their 18 home games in Goyang.

== Honours ==
- Korea National Ice Hockey Championship
  - Winners (7): 2006, 2007, 2008, 2011, 2012, 2015, 2018

== Team records ==
The statistics are counted for Asia League games only.

- Most games played: Kwon Tae-an, 387
- Most goals scored: Michael Swift, 224
- Most assists: Michael Swift, 286
- Most points accumulated: Michael Swift, 510
- Most PIM accumulated: Michael Swift, 747

== Media ==
In July 2009, High1's parent company High1 Resorts signed a five-year broadcast deal with SBS Sports to broadcast home games.

== Arenas ==
In the 2010–11 season, High1 played home games both in the Goyang Ice Rink in Goyang, as well as in the Eui Am Ice Rink in Chuncheon. They played 13 out of 18 home games in Goyang. Prior to the 2009–10 season, High1 also played its home games at the Mokdong Ice Rink in Seoul. The Goyang Ice Rink seats 2,607 and contains two separate rinks.

== Leaders ==
=== Team captains ===
- Park Jin-hong 2005–2006
- Shin Eu-serk 2006–2007
- Lee Myoung-woo 2007–2008
- Song Chi-young 2008–2009
- Hwang Byung-wook 2009–2010
- Kim Dong-hwan 2009–2012
- Kim Eun-joon 2012–2013
- Kwon Tae-an 2013–2019

=== Head coaches ===
- Kim Hee-woo 2004–2010
- Kim Yoon-sung 2010–2016
- Bae Young-ho 2016–2019
- Ahn Hyun-min 2020–2023

== Season-by-season record ==
=== Asia League ===
Season	GP	W	W (OT)	W (pen)*	T	L (pen)*	L (OT)	L	GF	GA	Pts.	Finish	Playoffs
2005–06	38	7	2	–	2	–	1	26	96	143	28	7th of 9	Did not qualify
2006–07	34	18	3	–	1	–	1	11	153	110	62	4th of 8	Semifinals
2007–08	30	17	2	–	1	–	2	8	118	89	58	2nd of 7	Semifinals
2008–09	36	13	0	1	–	3	2	17	97	112	46	5th of 7	Quarterfinals
2009–10	36	17	2	0	–	2	3	12	150	130	60	4th of 7	Semifinals
2010–11	36	15	1	1	–	0	2	17	131	112	51	5th of 7	Did not qualify
2011–12	36	16	3	0	–	1	2	14	120	126	57	5th of 7	Did not qualify
2012–13	42	13	2	0	–	3	2	22	164	160	48	6th of 7	Did not qualify
2013–14	42	18	1	1	–	5	4	13	152	134	67	4th of 8	Semifinals
2014–15	48	22	1	1	–	5	1	18	164	154	76	5th of 9	Semifinals
2015–16	48	12	2	0	–	2	3	29	121	170	45	7th of 9	Did not qualify
2016–17	48	10	1	4	–	0	3	30	118	197	43	7th of 9	Did not qualify
2017–18	28	9	1	0	–	2	4	12	76	91	35	8th of 8	Did not qualify
2018–19	34	13	0	2	–	0	4	15	79	88	47	6th of 8	Did not qualify
Totals	536	200	21	10	4	23	34	244	1739	1816	723	—	—

*Prior to the 2008–09 season, there were no shoot-outs and games ended in a tie.

== Import players ==
Canada

- Josh Liebenow 2005–2006, RW
- Steve McKenna 2006–2008, D/LW
- Bud Smith 2006–2008, F
- Tim Smith 2007–2011, C
- Chris Allen 2008–2009, D
- Brent Gauvreau 2008–2009, C
- Jeremy Van Hoof 2009–2010, D
- Trevor Gallant 2009–2010, C
- Alex Bourret 2010–2011, RW
- Bryan Young (Note: Initially registered as imports, the players later obtained South Korean citizenship and were not counted as import players anymore.) 2010–2017, D
- Michael Swift 2011–2018, C/LW
- Scott Barney 2012–2013, C/RW

Croatia

- David Brine 2013–2014, C

Czech Republic

- Tomáš Duba, 2018–2019, G

Finland

- Mikko Kukkonen 2016–2017, D

Israel

- Oren Eizenman 2011–2012, C

Sweden

- Pontus Moren 2006–2007, RW
- Magnus Österby 2008–2009, D

United States

- Dan Donnette 2005–2006, RW
- Steve Howard 2005–2006, D
- Alex Kim 2007–2010, C
- Jim Jackson 2010–2011, D
- Ryan Thang 2014–2015, RW/LW
- Mike Radja 2014–2015, C
- Tyler Brickler 2015–2017, F
- Jason Bacashihua 2017–2018, G
- Troy Milam 2017–2019, D
- Jeff Dimmen 2017–2018, D
