= 2016–17 Asia League Ice Hockey season =

2016–17 Asia League Ice Hockey
- League: Asia League Ice Hockey
- Sport: ice hockey
- Duration: August 27, 2016 – April 11, 2017
- Number of games: 230
- Number of teams: 9

Regular season
- Regular season leaders: (South Korea) Anyang Halla

Playoffs
- Finals champions: (South Korea) Anyang Halla
- Runners-up: (Russia) PSK Sakhalin
- Finals MVP: (South Korea) Matt Dalton

Asia League Ice Hockey seasons
- ← 2015–16 2017–18 →

The 2016–17 Asia League Ice Hockey season was the 14th season of Asia League Ice Hockey. The league consisted of nine teams from China, Japan, Russia, and South Korea. A new team for the season was the Daemyung Killer Whales. Daemyung Sangmu left the league. In addition, two more teams from China applied to join the league prior to this season. However, their inclusion was not possible earlier than the 2017–18 season.

== Participating teams ==
The table below reveals participating teams in the 2016–17 season, their residence, and when they joined Asia League Ice Hockey.

| Club | City/Area | Joined ALIH |
|---|---|---|
| Nippon Paper Cranes | (Japan) Kushiro | 2003 |
| Anyang Halla | (South Korea) Anyang | 2003 |
| Nikko Ice Bucks | (Japan) Nikkō | 2003 |
| Oji Eagles | (Japan) Tomakomai | 2003 |
| High1 | (South Korea) Chuncheon | 2005 |
| China Dragon | (China) Shanghai | 2007 |
| Tohoku Free Blades | (Japan) Hachinohe | 2009 |
| Daemyung Killer Whales | (South Korea) Incheon | 2016 |
| PSK Sakhalin | (Russia) Yuzhno-Sakhalinsk | 2014 |

== Regular season ==
Below is the final standings in the regular season.

| Place | Team | GP | W | OTW | SOW | SOL | OTL | L | GF–GA | Pts |
|---|---|---|---|---|---|---|---|---|---|---|
| 1 | y - Anyang Halla | 48 | 36 | 3 | 2 | 2 | 0 | 5 | 210–91 | 120 |
| 2 | y - PSK Sakhalin | 48 | 33 | 3 | 0 | 2 | 2 | 8 | 214–101 | 109 |
| 3 | x - Oji Eagles | 48 | 28 | 3 | 1 | 1 | 3 | 12 | 203–134 | 96 |
| 4 | x - Tohoku Free Blades | 48 | 26 | 1 | 1 | 0 | 3 | 17 | 185–135 | 85 |
| 5 | x - Nippon Paper Cranes | 48 | 23 | 1 | 1 | 3 | 3 | 17 | 169–153 | 79 |
| 6 | x - Nikko IceBucks | 48 | 17 | 4 | 3 | 1 | 3 | 20 | 157–153 | 69 |
| 7 | e - High1 | 48 | 10 | 1 | 4 | 0 | 3 | 30 | 118–197 | 43 |
| 8 | e - Daemyung Killer Whales | 48 | 7 | 1 | 0 | 1 | 2 | 37 | 107–231 | 26 |
| 9 | e - China Dragon | 48 | 4 | 3 | 0 | 2 | 1 | 38 | 106–274 | 21 |

y – Clinched first-round bye; x – Clinched playoff spot; e - Eliminated from playoff contention.

== Playoffs ==
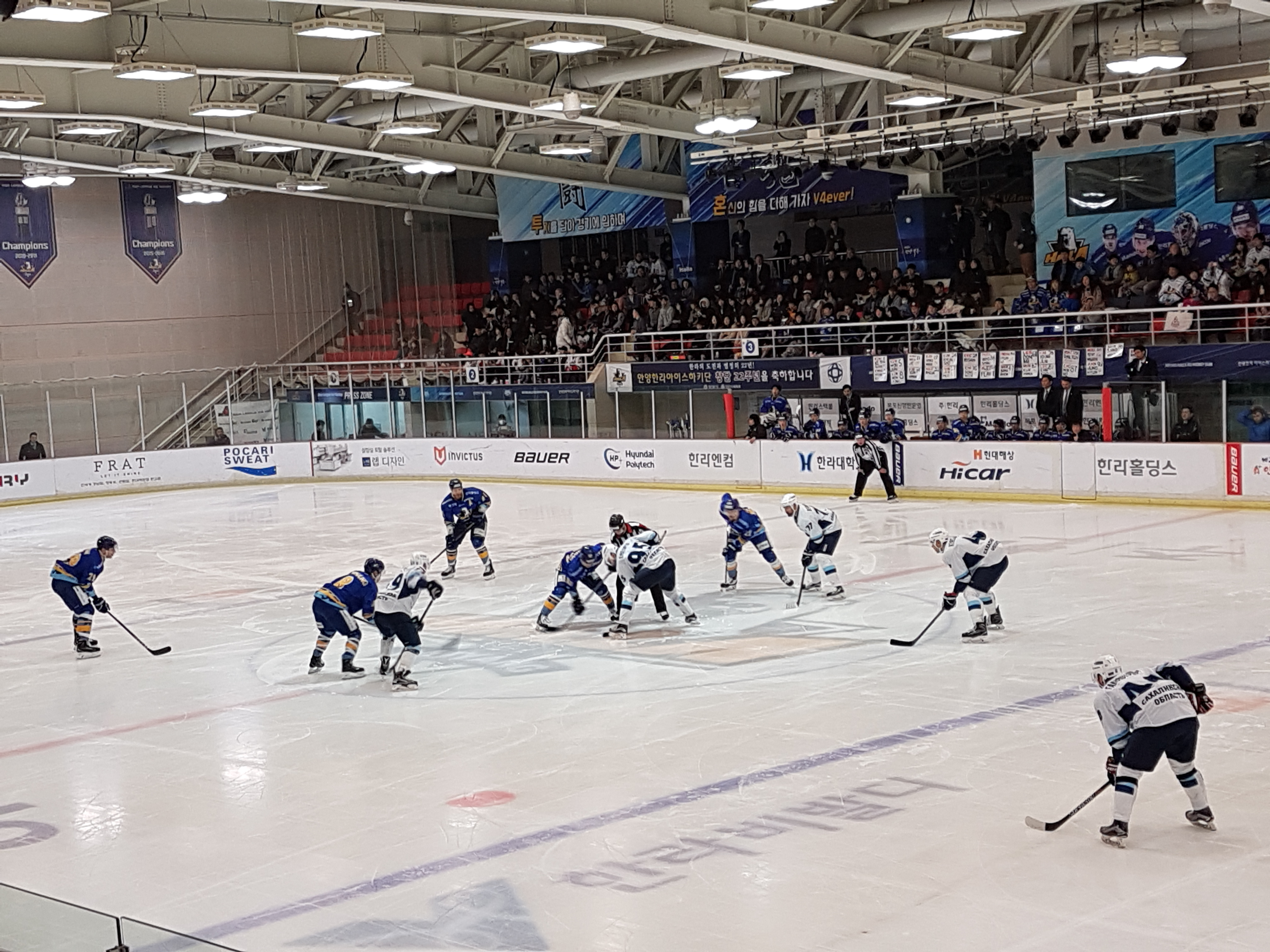
Opening faceoff of game one of the Final between Anyang Halla and Sakhalin.

First round
3 | Oji Eagles | 0
6 | Nikko | 2
4 | Tohoku | 2
5 | Nippon | 0

Semifinal
2 | Sakhalin | 3
6 | Nikko | 1
1 | Anyang Halla | 3
4 | Tohoku | 0

Final
1 | Anyang Halla | 3
2 | Sakhalin | 0
