= 2015–16 Asia League Ice Hockey season =

2015–16 Asia League Ice Hockey
- League: Asia League Ice Hockey
- Sport: ice hockey
- Duration: 29 August 2015 – 3 April 2016
- Number of games: 231
- Number of teams: 9

Regular season
- Regular season leaders: (South Korea) Anyang Halla
- Season MVP: (South Korea) Mike Testwuide
- Top scorer: (South Korea) Michael Swift (31+39=70p)

Playoffs
- Finals champions: (South Korea) Anyang Halla
- Runners-up: (Russia) PSK Sakhalin
- Finals MVP: (South Korea) Matt Dalton

Asia League Ice Hockey seasons
- ← 2014–15 2016–17 →

The 2015–16 Asia League Ice Hockey season was the 13th season of Asia League Ice Hockey. The league consisted of nine teams from China, Japan, Russia, and South Korea.

== Participating teams ==
The table below reveals participating teams in the 2015–16 season, their residence, and when they joined Asia League Ice Hockey.

| Club | City/Area | Joined ALIH |
|---|---|---|
| Nippon Paper Cranes | (Japan) Kushiro | 2003 |
| Anyang Halla | (South Korea) Anyang | 2003 |
| Nikko Ice Bucks | (Japan) Nikkō | 2003 |
| Oji Eagles | (Japan) Tomakomai | 2003 |
| High1 | (South Korea) Chuncheon | 2005 |
| China Dragon | (China) Shanghai | 2007 |
| Tohoku Free Blades | (Japan) Hachinohe | 2009 |
| Daemyung Sangmu | (South Korea) Seoul | 2013 |
| PSK Sakhalin | (Russia) Yuzhno-Sakhalinsk | 2014 |

== Regular season ==
Below is the final standings in the regular season.

| Place | Team | GP | W | OTW | SOW | SOL | OTL | L | GF–GA | Pts |
|---|---|---|---|---|---|---|---|---|---|---|
| 1 | y - Anyang Halla | 48 | 33 | 2 | 4 | 0 | 3 | 6 | 206–86 | 114 |
| 2 | y - PSK Sakhalin | 48 | 34 | 1 | 3 | 3 | 0 | 7 | 206–111 | 113 |
| 3 | x - Nippon Paper Cranes | 48 | 25 | 2 | 2 | 3 | 2 | 14 | 166–125 | 88 |
| 4 | x - Oji Eagles | 48 | 26 | 1 | 1 | 3 | 1 | 16 | 158–125 | 86 |
| 5 | x - Tohoku Free Blades | 48 | 20 | 4 | 1 | 2 | 1 | 20 | 138–141 | 73 |
| 6 | x - Nikko IceBucks | 48 | 16 | 3 | 5 | 3 | 4 | 17 | 145–150 | 71 |
| 7 | e - High1 | 48 | 12 | 2 | 0 | 2 | 3 | 29 | 121–170 | 45 |
| 8 | e - Daemyung Sangmu | 48 | 9 | 1 | 2 | 1 | 2 | 33 | 101–191 | 36 |
| 9 | e - China Dragon | 48 | 3 | 3 | 1 | 2 | 3 | 36 | 105–247 | 22 |

y – Clinched first-round bye; x – Clinched playoff spot; e - Eliminated from playoff contention.

== Playoffs ==
The teams placed 3-6 in the regular season met in the first round, while the teams placed 1-2 were direct qualified for semifinals. The first round was determined in best out of three games, while the semifinal and the final were determined in best out of five games.

First round
3 | Nippon | 2
6 | Nikko | 0
4 | Oji Eagles | 0
5 | Tohoku | 2

Semifinal
2 | Sakhalin | 3
3 | Nippon | 0
1 | Anyang Halla | 3
4 | Tohoku | 0

Final
1 | Anyang Halla | 3
2 | Sakhalin | 2
