= 2012–13 Asia League Ice Hockey season =

The 2012–13 Asia League Ice Hockey season was the 10th season of Asia League Ice Hockey, which consists of teams from China, Japan, and South Korea. Seven teams participated in the league, and the Tohoku Free Blades won the championship.

== Regular season ==
	Club	GP	W	OTW	SOW	SOL	OTL	L	Goals	Pts
1.	Oji Eagles	42	32	2	0	1	1	6	199–92	102
2.	Tohoku Free Blades	42	24	1	2	0	2	13	162–117	80
3.	Nippon Paper Cranes	42	17	4	6	3	3	9	176–130	77
4.	Anyang Halla	42	21	0	2	3	3	13	187–141	73
5.	Nikkō Ice Bucks	42	15	3	3	2	0	19	123–141	59
6.	High1	42	13	2	0	3	2	22	164–160	48
7.	China Dragon	42	0	0	0	1	1	40	67–297	2

== Playoffs ==
Semifinals
1	Oji Eagles	3
4	Anyang Halla	0
2	Tohoku Free Blades	3
3	Nippon Paper Cranes	1

Final
1	Oji Eagles	1
2	Tohoku Free Blades	3
