= Nordic Vikings =

Ice hockey team from Beijing, China

Nordic Vikings
Operated	2005–06
Home ice	Hosa Skating Center
Based in	Beijing, China
Colours	Red, with Black, White, Silver & Gold trim
League	Asia League Ice Hockey
Head coach	Peter Johansson

The Nordic Vikings was a professional ice hockey team from Beijing, China.

== Ice hockey ==
The Nordic Vikings played one season as a member of Asia League Ice Hockey during the 2005–06 season at the Hosa Skating Center. The Nordic Vikings finished fifth place of nine teams during the regular season, and were eliminated in the first round of the playoffs, losing three games to one to Oji Eagles.

== Bandy ==
In 2014, the Nordic Vikings was one of the initiators of the China Bandy Federation.
