= 2013–14 Asia League Ice Hockey season =

The 2013–14 Asia League Ice Hockey season was the 11th season of Asia League Ice Hockey, which consists of teams from China, Japan, and South Korea. Eight teams participated in the league, and the Nippon Paper Cranes won the championship.

== Regular season ==
	Club	GP	W	OTW	SOW	SOL	OTL	L	Goals	Pts
1.	Oji Eagles	42	32	2	5	0	0	3	194–74	110
2.	Daemyung Sangmu	42	22	3	1	3	1	12	156–115	78
3.	Nippon Paper Cranes	42	22	2	2	1	0	15	168–126	75
4.	High1	42	18	1	1	5	4	13	152–134	67
5.	Tohoku Free Blades	42	18	2	2	1	4	16	152–110	64
6.	Anyang Halla	42	17	2	2	1	4	16	152–110	64
7.	Nikkō Ice Bucks	42	14	0	1	1	1	25	25–130	46
8.	China Dragon	42	0	0	0	0	0	42	58–340	0

== Playoffs ==
Semifinals
1	Oji Eagles	3
4	High1	0
2	Daemyung Sangmu	0
3	Nippon Paper Cranes	3

Final
1	Oji Eagles	1
3	Nippon Paper Cranes	3
