= Daemyung Sangmu =

South Korean ice hockey team

- City: Mok-dong, Seoul, South Korea
- League: Asia League Ice Hockey
- Founded: 2012; 14 years ago
- Operated: 2013–2016
- Home arena: Mokdong Ice Rink
- Colors: Red, white, black

The Daemyung Sangmu was a professional ice hockey team based in Seoul, South Korea. The club played in the Asia League Ice Hockey (ALIH). Sangmu (상무, 尙武) is the sports division of the Korea Armed Forces Athletic Corps.

== Team history ==
Sangmu was established in 2012 by Korean government to prepare for the 2018 Pyeongchang winter Olympics. This team was made up of several players serving their two-year military service and therefore were unable to maintain practice and playing with their respective clubs, while conscripted. In its first season, 17 players played for Sangmu. Most players belonged to South Korea's national team. Sangmu, being a military team, unlike the other two Korean teams, Anyang Halla and High1, were not able to bring in any foreign imports, or trade for any players, nor could their players be traded to other teams. The team fully relied on home grown talent serving their compulsory military service.

=== Daemyung Sangmu (2013–2016) ===
The team debuted in the Asian Hockey league with a 6–1 loss to Anyang Halla on 7 September 2013.

== See also ==
- Conscription in South Korea
- Korea Armed Forces Athletic Corps
