= Asia League Ice Hockey =

Multinational ice hockey league

- Current season, competition or edition: 2026–27 Asia League Ice Hockey season
- Sport: Ice hockey
- Founded: 2003
- CEO: Ryuichi Kisaka
- No. of teams: 6
- Countries: Japan; South Korea
- Continent: East Asia
- Most recent champion: Red Eagles Hokkaido (2025–26)
- Most titles: HL Anyang (9 titles)
- Website: Official website

Asia League Ice Hockey (Japanese: アジアリーグアイスホッケー; Korean: 아시아리그 아이스하키) or ALIH (AL) is an association which operates a professional ice hockey league based in East Asia, with teams from Japan, South Korea, and formerly China and Russia. The league is headquartered in Japan. At the end of the playoffs every year the winner is awarded the Championship Trophy.

The league was formed in 2003 due to declining popularity in the Japan Ice Hockey League and the folding of the Korean Ice Hockey League. It was formed with the goal of promoting hockey and developing players' skills. The league initially comprised five teams in two countries. It expanded to highs of four countries (2004–05 season) and nine teams (2005–06 season) and it comprised eight teams from three countries in the 2013–14 season. Prior to the 2014–15 season, a Russian team from Yuzhno-Sakhalinsk, HC Sakhalin, was affiliated to the league.

The league draws most of its players from the home countries of its teams. However, the league allows each team a certain number of foreign imports on their roster.

== History ==
=== 2003–2008 ===
The league was formed after the collapse of the Korean ice hockey league and dissolution of the Japanese league. It was started with the goal of promoting hockey in Asia as well as helping the various participating countries develop their hockey programs and increase their showing in the Olympics. The first season was a shortened season of only five teams, and played as a tournament rather than a regular season. Four Japanese teams and a Korean team participated. The tournament lasted just two months and each team played four games, two at home and two away, against each other. Due to the shortened tournament format, there were no playoffs and the winner was declared from the point tally. The Nippon Paper Cranes won the tournament with 39 points. Joel Prpic from Kokudo was the assist and points leader with 25 assists and 33 points. Ryan Haruo Kuwabara, of the Cranes, was the scoring leader with 15 goals.

The 2004–05 season was the first full season for the league, and was seen by some to be the inaugural season. Before the season began, there was already interest by the National Hockey League (NHL) in China's hockey program. In addition to the five teams which took part in the tournament the year before, the league added Golden Amur from Russia as well as Harbin and Qiqihar from China. The first season had a schedule of 42 games. Teams played each other six times during the season. In December 2004 there was speculation by the South Korean media that North Korea could potentially field a team in the league, but that never materialized. The league also had an all-star game which took place on 22 and 23 January 2005 in Kushiro. The league was broken up into two teams, the Blue Orion and Red Antares. Fans voted on their favorite players and coaches. The most popular vote was for the forward position on the Blue Orion which received over 45,000 votes. Masatoshi Ito received the most votes with 9741. The skill competition and game were both won by the Blue Orion. The regular season finished with the Nippon Paper Cranes and Kokudo both having 98 points. After applying the league's tie-breaking procedure, the Nippon Paper Cranes were ranked first. The Nippon Paper Cranes also won the points race holding the top three spots in goals scored with Masatoshi Ito taking top honours at 33 goals. Darcy Mitani, also from the Cranes, took top spot in assists with 44 and points with 69. The playoffs saw the top four teams advance. The Golden Amur were swept in three games by Kokudo and the Cranes beat the Oji Paper in a close series, three games to one. The final was between the Cranes and Kokudo. While the Cranes won the first game, Kokudo won three games straight and won the playoffs. Chris Yule of Kokudo acquired ten points in the playoffs to lead the league while Chris Lindberg of the Cranes led the league in goals scored with six. Several players from Kokudo and the Cranes all had five assists. The 2005 ALH Awards were held in Tokyo and announced in April. Among the awards Kikuchi Naoya a goaltender for Kokudo was voted Most Valuable Player (MVP) and Matsuda Keisuke of the Nikkō Ice Bucks was voted Young Guy of the Year.

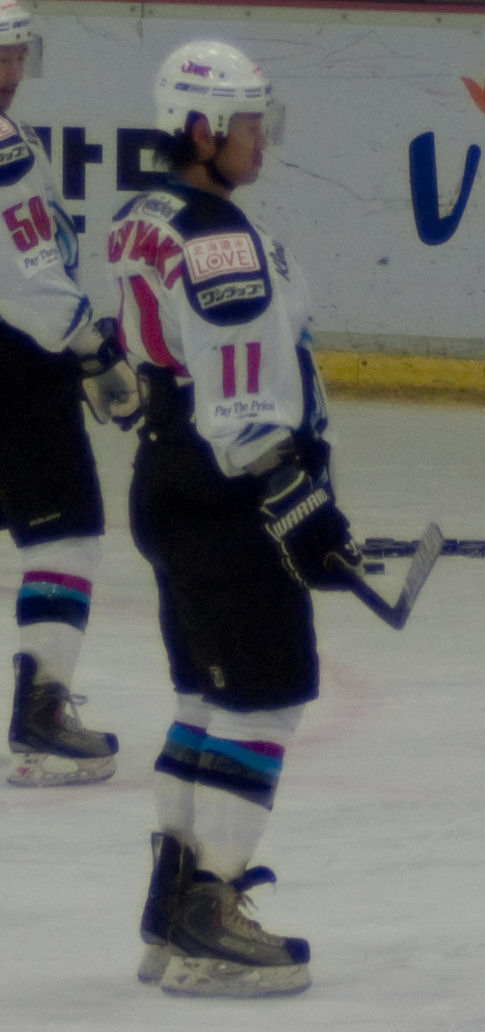
Masahito Nishiwaki was awarded "Young Guy of the Year" in 2006. In 2009 he helped lead his team to a championship with 12 goals in the playoffs.

The 2005–06 season saw a number of changes to the make-up of Asia League. In the off-season, the Golden Amur withdrew from the league due to financial trouble. At the same time it was announced that Kangwon Land was showing interest in entering a team in the league. However, only a few weeks later, they withdrew their application because it was felt their team wasn't strong enough to enter the league. The league also revised the limits on the number of imports some teams were allowed to have. Halla and the Ice Bucks were both allowed to carry an additional import player while the two Chinese teams were permitted two more import players. It was announced in July 2005 that Anyang Halla Winia would change their name to Anyang Halla. In late July, the league announced that Kangwon Land had acquired some imports and strengthened the team. They had applied again and were expected to enter the league that season. As well another new team, the Nordic Vikings, was expected to join the league. The Nordic Vikings were a Swedish-Chinese joint venture that saw the team based in Beijing. As part of the venture, Swedish players were also sent to the two existing Chinese teams. This brought the league to its high point of nine teams. Even though there were more teams than in the previous season the league reduced the number of games from 42 to 38, which resulted in an uneven schedule. For example, the Korean teams played nine games against each other, while playing four games against the teams from Japan and China except the Nordic Vikings, whom they played five times. At the end of the regular season, the Nippon Paper Cranes had captured first place for a second year in a row with 95 points. While the Cranes had a very strong showing in the point rankings, the top goal scorer was Song Dong-hwan from Anyang Halla with 31. Derek Plante led in assists with 47 and overall points with 75. The top six teams advanced to the playoffs with the top two teams, the Cranes and Halla, receiving a bye to the semi-finals. In the first round, Kokudo swept the Ice Bucks while Oji Paper defeated the Vikings three games to one. In the second round Kokudo faced Halla, who were making their playoff debut. Kokudo won that series three games to one. On the other side, the Cranes faced off against Oji Paper and swept them in three games. The final was again the Cranes vs Kokudo and once again Kokudo emerged victorious, claiming the title for the second year in a row. Kokudo had three players claiming the three top points spots for the playoffs. Joel Prpic was the top goal scorer with nine, Kiyoshi Fujita had the most assists with 12 and Takahito Suzuki had the most points with 18. Kikuchi Naoya won MVP of the year for the second time and Young Guy of the Year went to Masahito Nishiwaki of the Cranes.

Further changes were seen in the league in the 2006–07 season. After the last season The Nordic Vikings were looking for sponsors for the team. However, they failed to find sufficient sponsorship and left the league due to financial trouble. Harbin moved their home rink to Beijing and changed their name to Hosa to reflect this. Qiqihar acquired a new sponsor and changed their name to Changchun Fuao. Kokudo also changed their name to the Seibu Prince Rabbits. With eight teams, the league further reduced the number of games played to 34, which again resulted in an uneven play schedule. The Chinese-based teams, for example, played each other and the Korean teams each six times but only played the Japanese teams four times. The Paper Cranes easily won the regular season again finishing first with 86 points. With the previous year's goal leader not participating the scoring race went to Tim Smith of Kangwon Land. He led the league with 30 goals. Patrik Martinec of Halla led the league with 53 assists and 71 points. The playoffs followed the same format as the year before and six teams advanced. Kangwon Land swept Halla in three games and Oji Paper beat the Ice Bucks three games to one. While it was inevitable with two Korean teams facing each other, it marks the first time a non-Japanese team won a playoff series in Asia League. The second round was over quickly as the Cranes and Rabbits who both had byes swept their opponents in three games each. For the third year in a row the final was between the Paper Cranes and the Rabbits. The Cranes took the series in four games. Joel Prpic won himself another scoring title as he led the playoffs in goals, 8, and points, 17. Kengo Itoh for the Cranes had the most assists with 13. At the awards ceremony Itoh also took the award for MVP of the Year while Jun Tonosaki received the award for Young Guy of the Year.

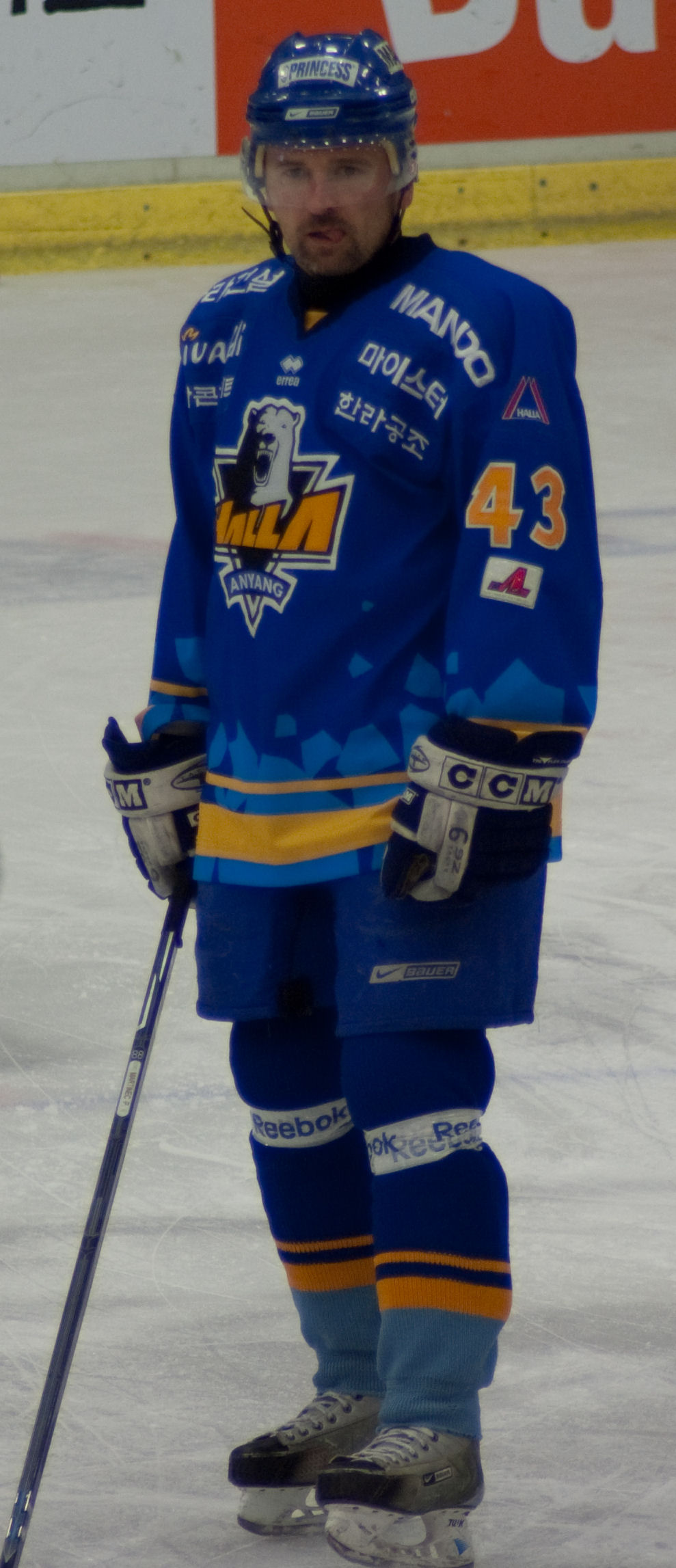
During his time in the league Patrik Martinec consistently found himself around the top of the points ranking, including winning four titles and an MVP award.

The 2007–08 season started with a further reduction in teams. Harbin and Qiqihar combined into a single team and became owned and operated by the San Jose Sharks. They took the name of their new owner and became the China Sharks. Kangwon Land renamed to High1. With only seven teams, the league reduced the number of games played to its lowest at just 30 games. The league continued with an unbalanced schedule and the Korean and Chinese teams played each other more than the Japanese teams did. After three years of dominance, the Nippon Paper Cranes slipped to fourth place and the regular season was won by the Prince Rabbits. Alex Kim, playing for High1, recorded the most goals with 23 and most points with 51. Joel Prpic continued to find himself on top of the pack with 30 assists. With six of seven teams going to the playoffs, the Sharks were the only team that didn't find themselves in a playoff spot. The first round was over quickly as the Cranes swept Halla in three games and Oji did the same to the Ice Bucks. Nippon faced their rivals, the Rabbits, in the second round and defeated them three to one. High1 couldn't repeat their success from the previous year by winning a series and were swept by Oji in three games. For the first time, the final series was not between the Cranes and Rabbits. Oji continued to roll over their opponents and swept the Cranes, marking the only time a team in Asia League had swept its way through three rounds. Due to their dominance on the ice, the point race was also swept by Oji. Takeshi Saito led the playoffs with nine assists and 15 points, while Shane Endicott had the most goals with 6. Kunihiko Sakurai, also from Oji, won the MVP of the Year and Eum Hyun-seung, from High1, won the Young Guy of the Year award.

=== Since 2008 ===
After several years of many changes to the teams, the 2008–09 season came with only one change. Oji Paper renamed themselves to Oji Eagles in July 2008. The league increased China's allowance to seven import players to help their competitiveness. Prior to the start of the regular season a series of exhibition games, dubbed "Anyang Cup 2008" was held in Anyang. Five of the seven teams in the league participated with the Ice Bucks and Rabbits sitting out. Oji won the exhibition tournament without losing a game. The league increased the number of games played to 36 and balanced the schedule by having all teams play each other an equal amount. Early in the season the Halla coach, Shim Eui-sik was suspended for refusal to play after a disputed goal against High1. Halla was forced to forfeit the game, but at the end of the regular season they had finished in first place with 76 points, becoming the first non-Japanese team to do so. Brock Radunske of Halla finished first in goals and points with 29 and 57 respectively. Kunihiko Sakurai, a previous MVP, finished on top with 40 assists in the regular season. The league reduced the number of teams making the playoffs and only five teams advanced. The first round saw a short three games series between the Cranes and High1. The Cranes swept High1 in two games. The second round found the regular season winners, Halla, facing the Cranes and Oji facing the Rabbits. Halla and the Cranes took it to seven games, but Halla lost on home ice. After the previous year's record setting playoff run, Oji found themselves swept by the Rabbits in four games. For the fourth time in five years the final was between the Rabbits and Cranes. The Cranes won for the second time. The Cranes swept the playoffs point race with Kengo Itoh taking the lead with 16 assists and 21 points. Masahito Nishiwaki led with 12 goals. Brock Radunske took the award for MVP of the Year marking the first time the award has gone to an import player. Young Guy of the Year went to Kim Ki-sung, also from Halla.

After a season with little change to the make-up of the league, the 2009–10 saw further change. The San Jose Sharks ended their association with the Chinese team. They pulled out all coaches and players they had sent. The Chinese Ice Hockey Association took over the team and brought in new import players and coaches to replace those lost. The team also changed its name from China Sharks to China Dragon. Midway through the previous season the Seibu Prince Rabbits announced that due to financial difficulties they would withdraw from the league at the end of the 2008–09 season. They were unable to find a buyer and the team folded. However, another team from Japan joined the league in the off-season. The Tohoku Free Blades were able to hire enough players and imports to join the league in time for the beginning of the season. This again left the league with seven teams. The league left the number of games played at 36, marking the first time that the league didn't adjust the schedule from the previous year. The league also introduced a couple of rules changes. All face-offs will take place on one of the nine face-off dots as well teams will no longer be allowed to change after an icing. Anyang Halla repeated as the regular season champions finishing with 79 points and 23 wins. The team also set the record for the most goals by a team in a 36-game season with 180. Alex Kim and Tim Smith lead the points race. Both finished with 75 points on the season, with Kim taking the goal scoring race with 29 and Smith taking the assists race with 48. The League further reduced the number of teams making the playoffs to only four. As well they brought in referees from outside the league to assist in officiating. The two Korean teams faced each other in one semi-final guaranteeing for the first time that a Korean team would appear in the final. Halla defeated High1 in four games after a loss on home ice. The Cranes similarly defeated the Eagles in four games. The final was a close series, needing all five games and with four of the five games only being decided by a single goal. In the final game, Halla tied the game with 17 seconds remaining and in over-time the team captain, Kim Woo-jae scored to give Halla a victory and mark the first time a non-Japanese team had won the cup. In the play-offs Brock Radunske led with six goals and 13 points overall while Darcy Takeshi Mitani led with 8 assists. Patrik Martinec took regular season MVP honors, and Cho Min-ho, also from Halla, was named Young Guy of the Year.

The 2010–11 season saw virtually no change to the structure of the season or league. All teams from the previous season remained in the league, and the number of games remained at 36. The regular season ran from 18 September 2010 to 20 February 2011. After two years of leading the league, Halla slipped to fourth place and Oji Eagles took the regular season honors with 76 points. Shunhei Kuji of Oji lead the league with 24 goals, while his teammate Yosuke Kon led with 45 assists. However, with a couple of second-place finishes, Go Tanaka of the Free Blades led the overall points race with 59. The League also maintained the number of play-off teams at four. Anyang faced Oji while Nippon faced Tohoku. Halla managed to take two of three in Japan and defeat Oji on home ice to advance. The Free Blades needed all five games to defeat the Cranes but the team came back with two straight wins to advance to the final for the first time in their short time in the league. However, a 9.0 magnitude earthquake near the Free Blades hometown forced the League to cancel the finals. Halla had already in Japan just an hour before the disaster struck the area. Fortunately, both teams survived, but the League felt the final could not go on. On 22 March 2011 the League declared that both Halla and the Free Blades would be declared co-champions. Though shortened, Masato Domeki of Oji led the playoffs with four goals, Bruce Mulherin led with six assists and fellow Free Blade Brad Farynuk had eights points overall.

In the 2013–14 season, a new Seoul-based team, Daemyung Sangmu, joined the league, and prior to the 2014–15 season a team from Yuzhno-Sakhalinsk, HC Sakhalin, was affiliated to the league. Beginning in the 2020–21 season, the Yokohama Grits joined the league, becoming the first ALIH team to play in the Greater Tokyo Area since the Seibu Prince Rabbits folded in 2009. On 2 August 2022, the league voted to remove Sakhalin in protest to the Russian invasion of Ukraine.

=== Records ===
Since its foundation in 2004, 18 different clubs have played in the ALIH, and 13 of them have at least once qualified for the playoffs. The table below gives the final regular-season ranks for all teams, with the playoff performance encoded in colors. The teams are ordered by their best championship results.

Club	2004	2005	2006	2007	2008	2009	2010	2011	2012	2013	2014	2015	2016	2017	2018	2019	2020	2023	2024	2025	2026
(South Korea) HL Anyang	3	5	2	5	5	1	1	4 (Note: The finals were canceled due to the 2011 Tōhoku earthquake and tsunami. Anyang Halla and Tohoku Free Blades shared the championship title.)	2	4	6	1	1	1	2	3	2 (Note: The finals were canceled due to the COVID-19 pandemic. Anyang Halla and PSK Sakhalin shared the championship title.)	1	1	1	2
(Japan) Nippon Paper Cranes	1	1	1	1	4	4	3	2	4	3	3	6	3	5	7	4					
(Japan) Red Eagles Hokkaido	4	4	4	3	3	3	2	1	1	1	1	4	4	3	5	5	3	2	2	2	1
(Japan) Tohoku Free Blades							5	3	6	2	5	3	5	4	3	8	7	5	3	4	4
(Japan) Seibu Prince Rabbits	2	2	3	2	1	2															
(Russia) PSK Sakhalin												2	2	2	1	2	1				
(Japan) Nikkō Ice Bucks	5	6	6	6	6	7	6	6	3	5	7	8	6	6	4	7	6	3	4	3	3
(South Korea) High1			7	4	2	5	4	5	5	6	4	5	7	7	8	6					
(South Korea) Daemyung Killer Whales														8	6	1	4				
(South Korea) Daemyung Sangmu											2	7	8								
(Russia) Golden Amur		3																			
(Japan) East Hokkaido Cranes																	5	4			
(China) Nordic Vikings			5																		
(Japan) Yokohama Grits																		6	5	5	5
China Dragon					7	6	7	7	7	7	8	9	9	9							
(Japan) Stars Kobe																					6
(China) Hosa		7	8	7																	
(China) Changchun Fuao		8	9	8																	

Color	Results
Red	Asia League Champions
Yellow	Lost in finals
Green	Lost in semifinals
Light blue	Lost in first round
Blue	Playoffs were not held
Light grey	Not qualified for playoffs
Grey	Did not play this season

== Game ==
Each Asia League Ice Hockey regulation games are played between two teams and are 60 minutes long. Games consist of three 20-minute periods separated by two 15-minute intermissions. While some teams have television broadcast contracts, they do not take television time-outs like the NHL. If the game is tied at the end of 60 minutes, the teams play an overtime period. Overtime is five minutes, with four skaters on each team. If the game remains tied after five minutes, then the teams partake in a three player shoot-out, until one team comes out ahead. Prior to the 2008–09 season these games ended in a tie with no shoot-out. In a playoff game the league does not use the shoot-out, and instead the teams play continuous overtime periods of 20 minutes until one team scores.

== Imports ==
Asia League Ice Hockey was established primarily for the development of ice hockey in Asia. The league allows teams to hire a small number of imports to play on the team in order to even out strength as well as increase the level of competitiveness in the league. Initially, China was allowed the most imports while the experienced Japanese teams were allowed the fewest. In the early seasons, the China Dragon was provided with western players from the San Jose Sharks as part of the sponsorship deals, and the two Chinese teams were provided Swedish players when the Nordic Vikings were active in the league. Prior to the 2018–19 season, the players from Russia were treated as imports if playing for a non-Russian teams; since the 2018–19 season, each team can have two import players, while the players with Russian citizenship are no longer treated as imports.

Several former National Hockey League players have played in the league, including Chris Allen, Greg Parks, Esa Tikkanen, Chris Lindberg, Tavis Hansen, Shjon Podein, Jason Podollan, Derek Plante, Steve McKenna, Jarrod Skalde, Joel Prpic, Tyson Nash, Jamie McLennan, Shane Endicott, Wade Flaherty, Kelly Fairchild, Brad Tiley, Ben Walter, Ricard Persson, Bryan Young, Claude Lemieux, Brad Fast, Ric Jackman and Cole Jarrett.

== Teams ==
Early in its existence, the league hoped to quickly expand to twelve teams, but could not due to financial difficulties. In the 2026–27 season, the Asia League Ice Hockey consists of six teams, with five teams from Japan and one from South Korea.

=== Current teams ===
List of 2026–27 teams
Team	Location	Arena	Joined
HL Anyang	(South Korea) Anyang	Anyang Ice Arena	2003
Nikkō Ice Bucks	(Japan) Nikkō	Nikkō Kirifuri Ice Arena	2003
Red Eagles Hokkaido	(Japan) Tomakomai	Nepia Ice Arena	2003
Red Eagles Hokkaido	(Japan) Sapporo	Tsukisamu Gymnasium	2003
Stars Kobe	(Japan) Amagasaki	Amagasaki Sports Forest	2025
Stars Kobe	(Japan) Kobe	Port Island Sports Center	2025
Tohoku Free Blades	(Japan) Hachinohe	Flat Hachinohe	2009
Yokohama Grits	(Japan) Yokohama	Kosé Shin-Yokohama Skate Center	2022

=== Former teams ===
List of former teams
Team	Location	Arena(s)	Joined	Left
Kokudo Ice Hockey Club	(Japan) Nishitōkyō	Suntory Higashi-fushimi Ice Arena	2003	2006
Nippon Paper Cranes	(Japan) Kushiro	Kushiro Ice Arena	2003	2019
High1	(South Korea) Goyang, Chuncheon, Seoul	Goyang Ice Rink; Eui Am Ice Rink; Mokdong Ice Rink	2004	2019
Golden Amur	(Russia) Khabarovsk	Platinum Arena	2004	2019
Changchun Fuao	(China) Qiqihar	Harbin Sports Center Pavilion	2004	2006
Hosa	(China) Harbin	Harbin Sports Center Pavilion	2004	2006
Seibu Prince Rabbits	(Japan) Nishitōkyō	DyDo Drinco Ice Arena	2006	2009
Nordic Vikings	(China) Beijing	Hosa Skating Center	2005	2006
China Sharks	(China) Beijing, Shanghai	Hosa Skating Center; Songjiang Stadium	2005	2009
China Dragon	(China) Harbin	Harbin Sports Center Pavilion	2009	2017
Daemyung Sangmu	(South Korea) Seoul	Mokdong Ice Rink	2012	2016
PSK Sakhalin	(Russia) Yuzhno-Sakhalinsk	Ice Palace Kristall	2013	2022
Daemyung Killer Whales	(South Korea) Seoul	Mokdong Ice Rink	2016	2021
East Hokkaido Cranes	(Japan) Kushiro	Kushiro Ice Arena	2019	2023

Asia League Ice Hockey teams location
Location of teams in the 2026–27 season
1 Anyang HL
2 Nikkō Ice Bucks
3 Red Eagles Hokkaido
4 Tohoku Free Blades
5 Yokohama Grits
6 Kobe Stars

== Champions ==
Year	Playoffs			Regular season winners
Year	Champions	Score	Finalists	Regular season winners
2003–04	Playoffs were not held.			Nippon Paper Cranes
2004–05	Seibu Prince Rabbits	3–1	Nippon Paper Cranes	Nippon Paper Cranes
2005–06	Seibu Prince Rabbits (2)	3–2	Nippon Paper Cranes	Nippon Paper Cranes
2006–07	Nippon Paper Cranes (2)	3–1	Seibu Prince Rabbits	Nippon Paper Cranes
2007–08	Oji Eagles	3–0	Nippon Paper Cranes	Seibu Prince Rabbits
2008–09	Nippon Paper Cranes (3)	4–3	Seibu Prince Rabbits	Anyang Halla
2009–10	Anyang Halla	3–2	Nippon Paper Cranes	Anyang Halla
2010–11	Playoffs cancelled due to the 2011 Tōhoku earthquake and tsunami. (Note: The finals were canceled due to the 2011 Tōhoku earthquake and tsunami. Finalists Anyang Halla and Tohoku Free Blades were named co-champions.)			Oji Eagles
2011–12	Oji Eagles (2)	3–1	Nikkō Ice Bucks	Oji Eagles
2012–13	Tohoku Free Blades (2)	3–1	Oji Eagles	Oji Eagles
2013–14	Nippon Paper Cranes (4)	3–1	Oji Eagles	Oji Eagles
2014–15	Tohoku Free Blades (3)	3–0	Anyang Halla	Anyang Halla
2015–16	Anyang Halla (3)	3–2	PSK Sakhalin	Anyang Halla
2016–17	Anyang Halla (4)	3–0	PSK Sakhalin	Anyang Halla
2017–18	Anyang Halla (5)	3–1	Oji Eagles	PSK Sakhalin
2018–19	PSK Sakhalin	3–0	Nippon Paper Cranes	Daemyung Killer Whales
2019–20	Playoffs cancelled due to the COVID-19 pandemic. (Note: The finals were canceled due to the COVID-19 pandemic. Finalists Anyang Halla and PSK Sakhalin were named co-champions.)			PSK Sakhalin
2020–21	Season cancelled due to the COVID-19 pandemic and held as Japan Cup.			
2021–22	Season cancelled due to the COVID-19 pandemic and held as Japan Cup.			
2022–23	HL Anyang (7)	3–2	Red Eagles Hokkaido	HL Anyang
2023–24	HL Anyang (8)	3–1	Red Eagles Hokkaido	HL Anyang
2024–25	HL Anyang (9)	3–1	Red Eagles Hokkaido	HL Anyang
2025–26	Red Eagles Hokkaido (3)	3–0	HL Anyang	Red Eagles Hokkaido

=== All-time record ===
Team	Titles	Years
HL Anyang	9	2009–10, 2010–11, 2015–16, 2016–17, 2017–18, 2019–20, 2022–23, 2023–24, 2024–25
Nippon Paper Cranes	4	2003–04, 2006–07, 2008–09, 2013–14
Red Eagles Hokkaido (earlier known as Oji Eagles)	3	2007–08, 2011–12, 2025–26
Tohoku Free Blades	3	2010–11, 2012–13, 2014–15
Seibu Prince Rabbits (earlier known as Kokudo)	2	2004–05, 2005–06
PSK Sakhalin	2	2018–19, 2019–20

== Season structure ==
The Asia League Ice Hockey season is divided into three parts. The late summer and early autumn parts consist of training camps and exhibition play. After that, the regular season takes place, which lasts for several months depending on the schedule. Finally several teams advance to a post-season playoff. This is an elimination tournament where teams play a "best-of" format to advance through the rounds. The final remaining team is crowned the champion for the year.

The regular season has been changed in almost every season that Asia League has been in operation. The first full season mirrors the two most recent seasons in which all teams play all other teams six times. With the number of teams changing from season to season in the first few years the league adjusted the schedule each year which often included an unbalanced schedule. Under the current schedule all teams make an away visit to each other team's home rink for a three-game series and also play a three-game series against that team at their own home rink. In order to minimize travel, teams traveling to other countries will stay there for two weeks and play two teams, except in the case of China who only has one team. Teams going to Japan will play against the Cranes and Eagles on the same trip as they are geographically close together, then in another trip play against the Free Blades and Ice Bucks.

The league ranks the teams by points. A regulation time win is worth three points. If the teams are tied at the end of regulation, both teams receive one point. The team which is victorious either in the overtime period or overtime shoot-out receives an additional point. A regulation time loss is worth zero points.

At the end of the regular season, the team which has the most points is awarded the title of regular season champion. The league in the past generally takes a several week break between the regular season and postseason. As with the regular season, the format of the playoffs has varied from year to year. In the 2009–10 season the top four teams advanced to the playoffs and play two best-of-five rounds. The league scheduled the end of the regular season and postseason around the Olympic break. In each round the higher ranked team from the regular season will receive a home-ice advantage and the series will begin play and have the majority of games play in their rink.

== Awards ==
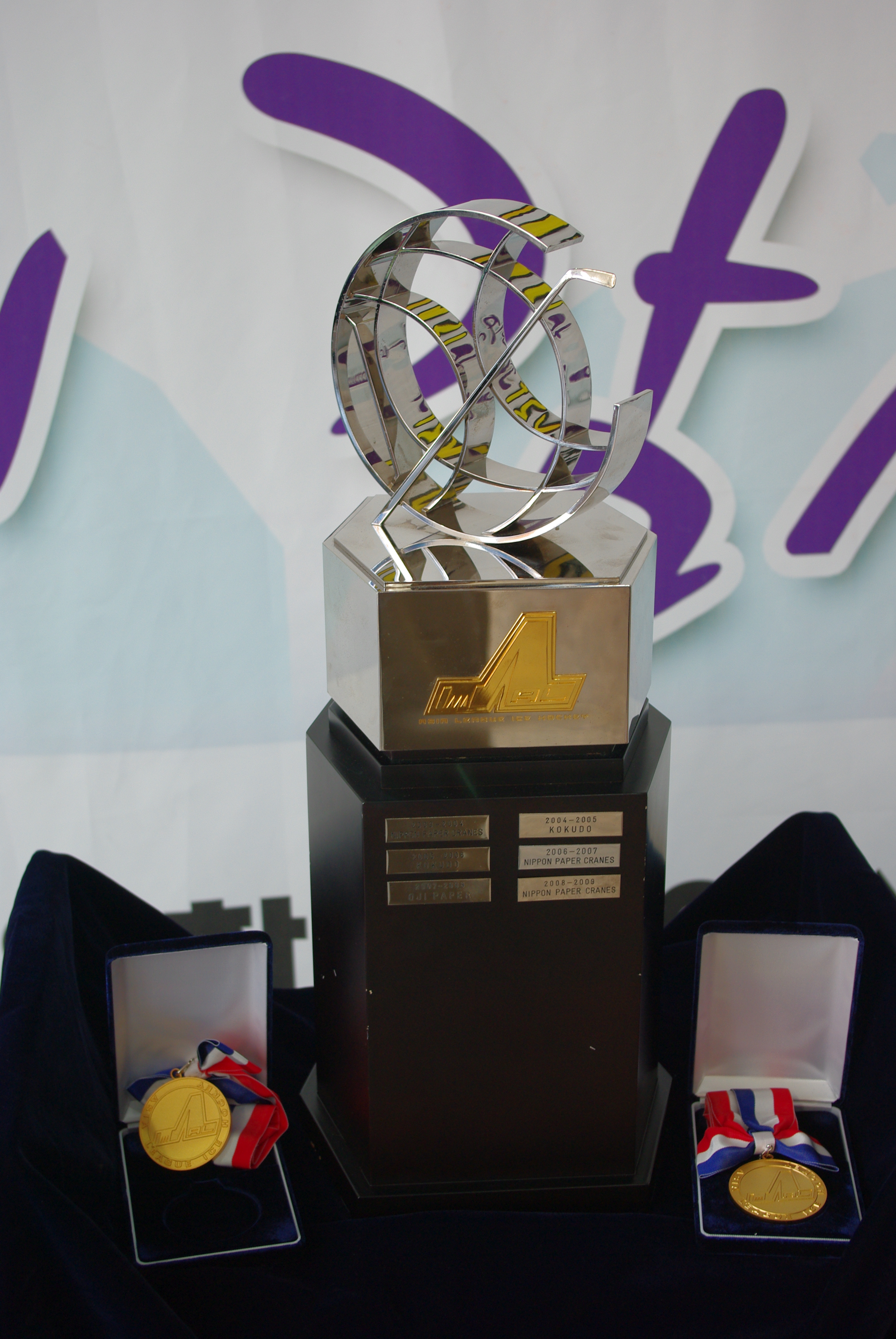
The Championship Trophy and gold medals given to the winning team

Asia League awards several awards each season in addition to The Championship Trophy. Prior to the 2008–09 season the awards were issued after the postseason but in that season they were issued during the break between the regular season and postseason. The league presents awards for:

- Most Valuable Player
- Young Guy of the Year
- Best Goaltender
- Best Offensive Defenceman
- Best Defensive Defenceman
- Best Offensive Forward
- Best Defensive Forward
- Best Playmaking Forward
- Best Hockey Town
- For most goals
- Most assists
- Most points
- Best save percentage for goaltenders

All of the awards, except for Best Hockey Town, are sponsored by an organization or individual.
