= Joel Dyck =

Japanese-Canadian ice hockey player

- Born: July 28, 1971 (age 53); Lethbridge, Alberta, Canada
- Height: 5 ft 10 in (178 cm)
- Weight: 172 lb (78 kg; 12 st 4 lb)
- Position: Defence
- Shot: Left
- Played for: Chatham Wheels (CoHL); Wheeling Thunderbirds (ECHL); Nippon Paper Cranes (Japan)
- National team: Japan
- NHL draft: Undrafted
- Playing career: 1992–2009

Joel Oshiro Dyck (born July 28, 1971) is a retired Japanese-Canadian professional ice hockey defenceman. He played 15 seasons in the Japan Ice Hockey League and the Asia League Ice Hockey with the Nippon Paper Cranes, and competed at the 2002, 2003, and 2004 IIHF World Championships as a member of the Japan men's national ice hockey team.

== Career statistics ==
			Regular season					Playoffs
Season	Team	League	GP	G	A	Pts	PIM	GP	G	A	Pts	PIM
1987–88	Swift Current Broncos	WHL	65	1	5	6	35	10	0	0	0	2
1988–89	Swift Current Broncos	WHL	29	5	7	12	20	—	—	—	—	—
1988–89	Regina Pats	WHL	15	0	3	3	20	—	—	—	—	—
1988–89	Kamloops Blazers	WHL	20	1	13	14	26	13	1	3	4	20
1989–90	Swift Current Broncos	WHL	45	5	7	12	38	4	0	2	2	4
1990–91	Swift Current Broncos	WHL	64	17	16	33	49	17	2	3	5	16
1991–92	Swift Current Broncos	WHL	80	11	12	23	46	4	1	2	3	2
1991–92	Seattle Thunderbirds	WHL	74	7	10	17	53	—	—	—	—	—
1992–93	Chatham Wheels	CoHL	48	8	23	31	48	—	—	—	—	—
1992–93	Wheeling Thunderbirds	ECHL	5	0	2	2	0	—	—	—	—	—
1994–95	Nippon Paper Cranes	JIHL	27	5	15	20	68	—	—	—	—	—
1995–96	Nippon Paper Cranes	JIHL	37	13	15	28	98	—	—	—	—	—
1996–97	Nippon Paper Cranes	JIHL	30	4	14	18	76	—	—	—	—	—
1997–98	Nippon Paper Cranes	JIHL	40	15	19	34	53	—	—	—	—	—
1998–99	Nippon Paper Cranes	JIHL	40	11	19	30	55	—	—	—	—	—
1999–00	Nippon Paper Cranes	JIHL	30	10	27	37	30	—	—	—	—	—
2000–01	Nippon Paper Cranes	JIHL	40	5	25	30	—	—	—	—	—	—
2001–02	Nippon Paper Cranes	JIHL	33	9	21	30	—	—	—	—	—	—
2002–03	Nippon Paper Cranes	JIHL	30	6	15	21	—	—	—	—	—	—
2000–01	Nippon Paper Cranes	JIHL/Asia	36	11	24	35	20	—	—	—	—	—
2004–05	Nippon Paper Cranes	Asia	38	8	18	26	106	4	1	2	3	6
2005–06	Nippon Paper Cranes	Asia	38	8	34	42	56	8	2	1	3	8
2006–07	Nippon Paper Cranes	Asia	34	7	24	31	62	7	0	6	6	20
2007–08	Nippon Paper Cranes	Asia	30	5	9	14	84	10	1	2	3	12
2008–09	Nippon Paper Cranes	Asia	36	4	13	17	42	—	—	—	—	—
ECHL totals			5	0	2	2	0	—	—	—	—	—
JIHL/Asia totals			519	121	292	413	750	29	4	11	15	46
