= Aaron Keller (ice hockey) =

Japanese ice hockey player

- Born: March 1, 1975 (age 50) Kamloops, British Columbia, Canada
- Height: 6 ft 0 in (183 cm)
- Weight: 185 lb (84 kg; 13 st 3 lb)
- Position: Defenceman
- Shot: Right
- Played for: IHL; Peoria Rivermen; ECHL; Chicago Wolves; AHL; Baltimore Bandits; Japan League; Sapporo Snow Brand; Sapporo Polaris; Oji Eagles; Asia League; Oji Eagles
- National team: Japan
- Playing career: 1996–2014

Aaron Keller
Medal record

Men's ice hockey

Representing Japan

Asian Games
Silver medal – second place	2011 Astana-Almaty	Ice hockey

Aaron Keller (アーロン・キャラー) (born March 1, 1975) is a Canadian-born, Japanese former professional ice hockey defenceman.

== Career ==
Born in Kamloops, British Columbia, Keller played junior hockey with his hometown team the Kamloops Blazers of the Western Hockey League and played with them for four seasons from 1992 to 1996. He then played his first professional season in 1996–97 with the Peoria Rivermen of the East Coast Hockey League, the Chicago Wolves of the International Hockey League and the Baltimore Bandits of the American Hockey League.

The next season, he moved to Sapporo, Japan, where he played three seasons for the (now defunct) team Sapporo Snow Brand, and the next season with the Sapporo Polaris (the team who replace the Sapporo Snow Brand, but they also folded after only one season). After the Sapporo Polaris was dissolved in 2002, he signed with the Oji Eagles and remained with the team for the remainder of his career until his retirement in 2014.

Keller is of Japanese descent through his maternal grandparents. He was also a regular member of the Japan national team, debuting for them in 2004.

== Career statistics ==
			Regular season					Playoffs
Season	Team	League	GP	G	A	Pts	PIM	GP	G	A	Pts	PIM
1992–93	Kamloops Blazers	WHL	70	4	34	38	34	11	2	5	7	4
1993–94	Kamloops Blazers	WHL	58	6	38	44	8	19	3	12	15	6
1993–94	Kamloops Blazers	WHL	71	18	62	80	34	15	3	13	16	6
1995–96	Kamloops Blazers	WHL	70	21	66	87	26	16	5	11	16	8
1996–97	Peoria Rivermen	ECHL	22	0	8	8	24	—	—	—	—	—
1996–97	Chicago Wolves	IHL	23	1	3	4	4	—	—	—	—	—
1996–97	Baltimore Bandits	AHL	11	3	2	5	2	1	0	0	0	0
1997–98	Snow Brand Sapporo	JIHL	40	5	25	30	20	—	—	—	—	—
1998–99	Snow Brand Sapporo	JIHL	40	8	22	30	36	—	—	—	—	—
1999–00	Snow Brand Sapporo	JIHL	30	7	11	18	63	—	—	—	—	—
2000–01	Snow Brand Sapporo	JIHL	40	4	18	22	—	8	3	4	7	—
2001–02	Sapporo Polaris	JIHL	25	0	9	9	—	—	—	—	—	—
2002–03	Oji Seishi Hockey	JIHL	31	3	17	20	—	—	—	—	—	—
2003–04	Oji Eagles	Asia League	10	0	4	4	12	—	—	—	—	—
2003–04	Oji Eagles	JIHL	24	4	16	20	34	—	—	—	—	—
2004–05	Oji Eagles	Asia League	38	6	23	29	39	4	0	2	2	14
2005–06	Oji Eagles	Asia League	38	12	25	37	49	7	1	4	5	14
2006–07	Oji Eagles	Asia League	34	10	31	41	20	4	0	2	2	4
2007–08	Oji Eagles	Asia League	29	3	15	18	47	8	2	2	4	2
2008–08	Oji Eagles	Asia League	36	5	19	24	24	4	1	0	1	14
2009–10	Oji Eagles	Asia League	36	6	13	19	24	4	0	1	1	2
2010–11	Oji Eagles	Asia League	36	10	17	27	14	4	0	0	0	0
2011–12	Oji Eagles	Asia League	35	4	17	21	16	7	5	4	9	0
2012–13	Oji Eagles	Asia League	40	10	26	36	14	7	1	4	5	6
2013–14	Oji Eagles	Asia League	42	4	31	35	40	7	3	4	7	4
JIHL totals			230	31	118	149	153	8	3	4	7	—
Asia League totals			374	70	221	291	299	56	13	23	36	60

== Awards ==
- WHL West Second All-Star Team – 1995
- Best Defenseman (Asian Winter Games Top Division 2011)
