= Chris Bright =

Canadian ice hockey player

- Born: October 14, 1970 (age 56) Guelph, Ontario, Canada
- Height: 6 ft 0 in (183 cm)
- Weight: 187 lb (85 kg; 13 st 5 lb)
- Position: Right wing
- Shot: Left
- Played for: AHL; Springfield Indians; Rochester Americans; Worcester IceCats; ECHL; Louisville Icehawks; South Carolina Stingrays
- National team: Canada and Japan
- NHL draft: 78th overall, 1990; Hartford Whalers
- Playing career: 1990–2008

Chris Bright (born October 14, 1970) is a Canadian-born Japanese former professional ice hockey player. He was selected by the Hartford Whalers in the fourth round (78th overall) of the 1990 NHL entry draft.

== Career statistics ==
			Regular season					Playoffs
Season	Team	League	GP	G	A	Pts	PIM	GP	G	A	Pts	PIM
1987–88	Moose Jaw Warriors	WHL	20	2	2	4	10	—	—	—	—	—
1988–89	Moose Jaw Warriors	WHL	71	18	27	45	61	7	2	0	2	6
1989–90	Moose Jaw Warriors	WHL	72	36	38	74	107	—	—	—	—	—
1990–91	Springfield Indians	AHL	37	3	4	7	32	—	—	—	—	—
1991–92	Springfield Indians	AHL	8	1	0	1	6	—	—	—	—	—
1991–92	Louisville Icehawks	ECHL	46	17	39	56	61	13	9	8	17	18
1992–93	Louisville Icehawks	ECHL	63	30	38	68	159	—	—	—	—	—
1993–94	Rochester Americans	AHL	9	1	0	1	6	—	—	—	—	—
1993–94	Springfield Indians	AHL	5	0	0	0	4	—	—	—	—	—
1993–94	South Carolina Stingrays	ECHL	69	40	47	87	134	3	2	2	4	10
1994–95	Worcester IceCats	AHL	1	0	0	0	4	—	—	—	—	—
1994–95	South Carolina Stingrays	ECHL	3	2	2	4	2	—	—	—	—	—
1995–96	Seibu Bears Tokyo	JIHL	40	27	22	49	94	—	—	—	—	—
1996–97	Seibu Bears Tokyo	JIHL	30	25	24	49	60	—	—	—	—	—
1997–98	Seibu Bears Tokyo	JIHL	40	28	27	55	64	—	—	—	—	—
1998–99	Seibu Bears Tokyo	JIHL	38	28	31	59	84	—	—	—	—	—
1999–00	Seibu Bears Tokyo	JIHL	30	27	27	54	73	—	—	—	—	—
2000–01	Seibu Bears Tokyo	JIHL	40	22	40	62	86	—	—	—	—	—
2001–02	Seibu Bears Tokyo	JIHL	40	28	30	58	81	—	—	—	—	—
2002–03	Seibu Bears Tokyo	JIHL	30	15	25	40	64	—	—	—	—	—
2003–04	Kokudo	Asia League	14	11	8	19	41	—	—	—	—	—
2003–04	Kokudo	JIHL	24	23	16	39	20	—	—	—	—	—
2004–05	Kokudo	Asia League	35	6	25	31	73	7	2	5	7	4
2005–06	Frankfurt Lions	DEL	29	7	4	11	64	—	—	—	—	—
2006–07	EHC Basel	NLA	44	11	20	31	123	—	—	—	—	—
2007–08	HK Jesenice	EBEL	9	3	3	6	6	—	—	—	—	—
2007–08	Hannover Scorpions	DEL	38	4	12	16	26	3	0	0	0	0
AHL totals			60	5	4	9	52	—	—	—	—	—
ECHL totals			181	89	126	215	356	16	11	10	21	28
JIHL totals			312	223	242	465	626	—	—	—	—	—

== International career ==
- Bright competed at the 1995 Men's World Ice Hockey Championships as a member of the Canada men's national ice hockey team coached by Tom Renney.
- Bright competed at the 2004 Men's World Ice Hockey Championships as a member of the Japan men's national ice hockey team coached by Mark Mahon.
