= Corey Foster =

Canadian ice hockey player (born 1969)

- Born: October 27, 1969 (age 57) Ottawa, Ontario, Canada
- Height: 6 ft 3 in (191 cm)
- Weight: 205 lb (93 kg; 14 st 9 lb)
- Position: Defence
- Shot: Left
- Played for: New Jersey Devils
- NHL draft: 12th overall, 1988; New Jersey Devils
- Playing career: 1989–2005

Corey J. Foster (born October 27, 1969) is a Canadian former ice hockey defenceman.

== Playing career ==
Foster was drafted 12th overall by the New Jersey Devils in the 1988 NHL entry draft. As well as the Devils, he played in the National Hockey League for the Philadelphia Flyers, Pittsburgh Penguins and the New York Islanders. He played a total of 45 regular season games, scoring 5 goals and 11 points, he also played 3 playoff games for Pittsburgh during the 1995–96 NHL season. After leaving the Islanders, Foster spent four seasons playing in Japan and also played in Germany's Deutsche Eishockey Liga for one season. He retired in 2005 after a season with Elmira Jackals.

== Career statistics ==
=== Regular season and playoffs ===
			Regular season					Playoffs
Season	Team	League	GP	G	A	Pts	PIM	GP	G	A	Pts	PIM
1985–86	Ottawa West Golden Knights	EOJHL	37	15	35	50	30	—	—	—	—	—
1986–87	Peterborough Roadrunners	MetJHL	23	7	16	23	46	—	—	—	—	—
1986–87	Peterborough Petes	OHL	30	3	4	7	4	1	0	0	0	0
1987–88	Peterborough Petes	OHL	66	13	31	44	58	11	5	9	14	13
1988–89	New Jersey Devils	NHL	2	0	0	0	0	—	—	—	—	—
1988–89	Peterborough Petes	OHL	55	14	42	56	42	17	1	17	18	12
1989–90	Cape Breton Oilers	AHL	54	7	17	24	32	1	0	0	0	0
1990–91	Cape Breton Oilers	AHL	67	14	11	25	51	4	2	4	6	4
1991–92	Philadelphia Flyers	NHL	25	3	4	7	20	—	—	—	—	—
1991–92	Hershey Bears	AHL	19	5	9	14	26	6	1	1	2	5
1992–93	Hershey Bears	AHL	80	9	25	34	102	—	—	—	—	—
1993–94	Hershey Bears	AHL	66	21	37	58	96	9	2	5	7	10
1994–95	PEI Senators	AHL	78	13	34	47	61	11	2	5	7	12
1995–96	Pittsburgh Penguins	NHL	11	2	2	4	2	3	0	0	0	4
1995–96	Cleveland Lumberjacks	IHL	61	10	36	46	93	—	—	—	—	—
1996–97	New York Islanders	NHL	7	0	0	0	2	—	—	—	—	—
1996–97	Cleveland Lumberjacks	IHL	51	5	29	34	71	14	0	9	9	22
1997–98	Kokudo Ice Hockey Club	JPN	37	18	13	31	101	—	—	—	—	—
1998–99	Kokudo Ice Hockey Club	JPN	36	6	21	27	155	9	0	2	2	16
1999–2000	Kokudo Ice Hockey Club	JPN	28	11	15	26	52	7	1	6	7	8
2000–01	Kokudo Ice Hockey Club	JPN	16	4	8	12		6	0	2	2	12
2001–02	Berlin Capitals	DEL	35	1	3	4	42	—	—	—	—	—
2002–03	Springfield Falcons	AHL	54	8	26	34	48	6	2	3	5	8
2003–04	Saint-Jean Mission	QSPHL	28	0	14	14	10	—	—	—	—	—
2003–04	Nippon Paper Cranes	JPN	12	2	7	9		—	—	—	—	—
2004–05	Elmira Jackals	UHL	41	6	16	22	28	—	—	—	—	—
NHL totals			45	5	6	11	24	3	0	0	0	4
AHL totals			418	77	159	236	416	37	9	18	27	39
JPN totals			129	41	64	105	—	22	1	10	11	36

=== International ===
Year	Team	Event	GP	G	A	Pts	PIM
1989	Canada	WJC	7	1	3	4	4

Preceded by Brendan Shanahan	New Jersey Devils first-round draft pick 1988	Succeeded by Bill Guerin
