= Rob Dopson =

Canadian ice hockey player (b. 1967)

- Born: August 21, 1967 (age 58) Smiths Falls, Ontario, Canada
- Height: 6 ft 1 in (185 cm)
- Weight: 205 lb (93 kg; 14 st 9 lb)
- Position: Goaltender
- Caught: Left
- Played for: Pittsburgh Penguins; Ayr Scottish Eagles; Nippon Paper Cranes; Sheffield Steelers
- NHL draft: Undrafted
- Playing career: 1990–2004

Robert James Dopson (born August 21, 1967) is a Canadian former professional ice hockey goaltender. He played 2 games in the National Hockey League for the Pittsburgh Penguins during the 1993–94 season. The rest of his career, which lasted from 1990 to 2004, was spent in the minor leagues and then in the Japan Ice Hockey League.

== Biography ==
Dopson was born in Smiths Falls, Ontario. He played in the National Hockey League (NHL) for the Pittsburgh Penguins, with whom he made two appearances in the 1993–94 season.

While attending Wilfrid Laurier University, he played for the Wilfrid Laurier Golden Hawks from 1987–88 to 1989–90. He backstopped the Golden Hawks to the national CIAU University Cup championship final in 1989 and 1990; though the Golden Hawks lost both finals, Dopson won the Major W.J. "Danny" McLeod Award in 1990, as Most Valuable Player of the national championship tournament.

== Career statistics ==
=== Regular season and playoffs ===
			Regular season									Playoffs
Season	Team	League	GP	W	L	T	MIN	GA	SO	GAA	SV%	GP	W	L	MIN	GA	SO	GAA	SV%
1982–83	Smiths Falls Settlers	EOJBHL	2	0	1	0	80	14	0	10.50	—	—	—	—	—	—	—	—	—
1983–84	Smiths Falls Settlers	EOJBHL	27	10	14	1	1590	157	0	5.92	—	—	—	—	—	—	—	—	—
1984–85	Newmarket Flyers	OJAHL	32	17	12	5	1910	163	0	5.12	—	—	—	—	—	—	—	—	—
1984–85	Kitchener Rangers	OHL	2	1	1	0	100	8	0	4.80	—	—	—	—	—	—	—	—	—
1985–86	Nepean Raiders	CJHL	20	11	3	0	872	47	1	3.23	—	—	—	—	—	—	—	—	—
1985–86	Kitchener Rangers	OHL	8	5	2	0	403	32	0	4.76	.846	—	—	—	—	—	—	—	—
1986–87	Smiths Falls Bears	CJHL	30	12	11	5	1640	98	1	3.59	—	—	—	—	—	—	—	—	—
1987–88	Wilfrid Laurier University	CIAU	6	—	—	—	336	23	0	4.12	—	—	—	—	—	—	—	—	—
1988–89	Wilfrid Laurier University	CIAU	23	—	—	—	1323	64	0	2.90	—	—	—	—	—	—	—	—	—
1989–90	Wilfrid Laurier University	CIAU	22	—	—	—	1319	57	0	2.59	—	—	—	—	—	—	—	—	—
1990–91	Muskegon Lumberjacks	IHL	24	10	10	0	1243	90	0	4.34	—	—	—	—	—	—	—	—	—
1990–91	Louisville Icehawks	ECHL	3	3	0	0	180	12	0	4.00	.904	5	3	1	270	16	0	3.55	—
1991–92	Muskegon Lumberjacks	IHL	29	13	12	2	1655	90	4	3.26	—	12	8	4	697	40	0	3.44	—
1992–93	Cleveland Lumberjacks	IHL	50	26	15	3	2825	167	1	3.55	.890	4	0	4	203	20	0	5.91	.854
1993–94	Pittsburgh Penguins	NHL	2	0	0	0	46	3	0	3.96	.870	—	—	—	—	—	—	—	—
1993–94	Cleveland Lumberjacks	IHL	32	9	10	8	1681	109	0	3.89	.890	—	—	—	—	—	—	—	—
1994–95	Houston Aeros	IHL	41	17	16	2	2102	119	0	3.40	.889	1	0	0	40	6	0	9.00	.760
1995–96	Louisiana IceGators	ECHL	2	1	0	1	120	4	0	2.00	.932	—	—	—	—	—	—	—	—
1995–96	Kansas City Blades	IHL	5	1	0	1	183	10	0	3.28	.886	—	—	—	—	—	—	—	—
1995–96	Houston Aeros	IHL	33	9	13	2	1518	96	0	3.79	.882	—	—	—	—	—	—	—	—
1996–97	Houston Aeros	IHL	12	5	4	1	637	36	0	3.39	.895	—	—	—	—	—	—	—	—
1997–98	Ayr Scottish Eagles	BISL	29	—	—	—	1742	70	0	2.42	.924	9	—	—	567	19	0	2.01	.934
1998–99	Nippon Paper Cranes	JIHL	33	—	—	—	1681	93	0	3.22	—	5	2	3	298	18	0	3.62	—
1998–99	Canadian National Team	Intl	3	2	0	0	147	7	0	2.86	—	—	—	—	—	—	—	—	—
1998–99	Lake Charles Ice Pirates	WPHL	—	—	—	—	—	—	—	—	—	9	4	5	541	29	1	3.22	.908
1999–00	Nippon Paper Cranes	JIHL	25	—	—	—	1459	66	0	2.71	.916	2	1	1	159	4	0	1.51	—
2000–01	Nippon Paper Cranes	JIHL	39	19	17	3	2356	108	0	2.75	.910	3	0	3	184	11	0	3.58	.896
2001–02	Nippon Paper Cranes	JIHL	33	—	—	—	—	96	0	2.48	.911	—	—	—	—	—	—	—	—
2002–03	Nippon Paper Cranes	JIHL	30	—	—	—	—	—	—	2.82	.908	—	—	—	—	—	—	—	—
2003–04	Sheffield Steelers	EIHL	29	—	—	—	—	—	—	2.21	.924	—	—	—	—	—	—	—	—
NHL totals			2	0	0	0	46	3	0	3.96	.870	—	—	—	—	—	—	—	—
