= Al Conroy =

Canadian ice hockey player

- Born: January 17, 1966 (age 59); Calgary, Alberta, Canada
- Height: 5 ft 8 in (173 cm)
- Weight: 170 lb (77 kg; 12 st 2 lb)
- Position: Centre
- Shot: Right
- Played for: Philadelphia Flyers; HC Varese; Nippon Paper Cranes
- NHL draft: Undrafted
- Playing career: 1986–2001

John Allan Conroy (born January 17, 1966) is a Canadian former professional ice hockey centre. He played in 114 National Hockey League (NHL) games over parts of three seasons with the Philadelphia Flyers from 1992 to 1994. The rest of his career, which lasted from 1986 to 2001, was spent in the minor leagues and then in Europe and Japan.

== Career statistics ==
=== Regular season and playoffs ===
			Regular season					Playoffs
Season	Team	League	GP	G	A	Pts	PIM	GP	G	A	Pts	PIM
1981–82	Hobbema Hawks	AJHL	52	23	39	62	172	—	—	—	—	—
1982–83	Medicine Hat Tigers	WHL	68	38	57	95	203	5	4	3	7	16
1983–84	Medicine Hat Tigers	WHL	69	38	74	112	89	14	10	13	23	39
1984–85	Medicine Hat Tigers	WHL	68	41	97	138	150	10	1	9	10	20
1985–86	Medicine Hat Tigers	WHL	61	41	60	101	141	25	11	20	31	54
1986–87	SC Rapperswil-Jona	NLB	36	30	31	61	64	—	—	—	—	—
1986–87	Rochester Americans	AHL	13	4	4	8	40	13	1	3	4	50
1987–88	HC Varese	ITA	36	23	37	60	63	10	6	4	10	20
1987–88	Adirondack Red Wings	AHL	13	5	8	13	20	11	1	3	4	41
1988–89	ERC Westfalen Dortmund	GER-2	46	53	78	131		—	—	—	—	—
1989–90	Adirondack Red Wings	AHL	77	23	33	56	147	5	0	0	0	20
1990–91	Adirondack Red Wings	AHL	80	26	39	65	172	2	1	1	2	0
1991–92	Hershey Bears	AHL	47	17	28	45	90	6	4	2	6	12
1991–92	Philadelphia Flyers	NHL	31	2	9	11	74	—	—	—	—	—
1992–93	Hershey Bears	AHL	60	28	32	60	130	—	—	—	—	—
1992–93	Philadelphia Flyers	NHL	21	3	2	5	17	—	—	—	—	—
1993–94	Philadelphia Flyers	NHL	62	4	3	7	65	—	—	—	—	—
1994–95	Nippon Paper Cranes	JIHL	1	0	0	0	0	—	—	—	—	—
1994–95	Detroit Vipers	IHL	71	18	40	58	151	—	—	—	—	—
1994–95	Houston Aeros	IHL	9	3	4	7	17	4	1	2	3	8
1995–96	Houston Aeros	IHL	82	24	38	62	134	—	—	—	—	—
1996–97	Houston Aeros	IHL	70	15	32	47	171	13	4	10	14	26
1997–98	Nippon Paper Cranes	JIHL	40	21	41	62	66	—	—	—	—	—
1998–99	Nippon Paper Cranes	JIHL	37	18	36	54	89	2	0	2	2	0
1999–00	Nippon Paper Cranes	JIHL	30	18	24	42	71	5	0	4	4	4
2000–01	Nippon Paper Cranes	JIHL	31	15	30	45		3	0	0	0	8
NHL totals			114	9	14	23	156	—	—	—	—	—

=== International ===
Year	Team	Event	GP	G	A	Pts	PIM
1986	Canada	WJC	7	4	4	8	6
Junior totals			7	4	4	8	6

== Awards ==
- WHL East First All-Star Team – 1986
