= Steve Tsujiura =

Canadian ice hockey player

- Born: February 28, 1962 (age 64) Coaldale, Alberta, Canada
- Height: 5 ft 6 in (168 cm)
- Weight: 165 lb (75 kg; 11 st 11 lb)
- Position: Centre
- Shot: Right
- Played for: HC Lugano; HC Davos; Kokudo Tokyo
- National team: Japan
- NHL draft: 205th overall, 1981; Philadelphia Flyers
- Playing career: 1982–1998

Steven Ken Tsujiura (born February 28, 1962) is a Canadian-born Japanese former professional ice hockey centre who played in the American Hockey League (AHL), the Swiss National League A (NLA) and the Japan Ice Hockey League (JIHL). He played in the 1998 Winter Olympics for host country Japan. He was selected by the Philadelphia Flyers in the 10th round (205th overall) of the 1981 NHL entry draft.

== Awards and honours ==
- AHL Fred T. Hunt Memorial Award (1985–86)
- WHL Most Sportsmanlike Player (1979–80 & 1980–81)
- WHL Player of the Year (1980–81)
- WHL Second All-Star Team (1980-81)

== Career statistics ==
=== Regular season and playoffs ===
| | | | Regular season | | | | | Playoffs |
| Season | Team | League | GP | G | A | Pts | PIM | GP | G | A | Pts | PIM |
|---|---|---|---|---|---|---|---|---|---|---|---|---|
| 1976–77 | Taber Golden Suns | AJHL | 52 | 32 | 39 | 71 | 10 | — | — | — | — | — |
| 1977–78 | Taber Golden Suns | AJHL | 55 | 27 | 45 | 72 | 16 | — | — | — | — | — |
| 1977–78 | Medicine Hat Tigers | WCHL | 17 | 5 | 8 | 13 | 0 | 12 | 4 | 9 | 13 | 4 |
| 1978–79 | Medicine Hat Tigers | WHL | 62 | 24 | 45 | 69 | 14 | — | — | — | — | — |
| 1979–80 | Medicine Hat Tigers | WHL | 72 | 25 | 77 | 102 | 36 | 16 | 9 | 4 | 13 | 14 |
| 1980–81 | Medicine Hat Tigers | WHL | 72 | 55 | 84 | 139 | 60 | 5 | 4 | 4 | 8 | 0 |
| 1981–82 | Medicine Hat Tigers | WHL | 31 | 24 | 45 | 69 | 31 | — | — | — | — | — |
| 1981–82 | Calgary Wranglers | WHL | 6 | 2 | 8 | 10 | 2 | 9 | 3 | 9 | 12 | 15 |
| 1982–83 | Maine Mariners | AHL | 78 | 15 | 51 | 66 | 46 | 14 | 3 | 4 | 7 | 8 |
| 1983–84 | Springfield Indians | AHL | 78 | 24 | 56 | 80 | 27 | 4 | 4 | 3 | 7 | 2 |
| 1984–85 | Maine Mariners | AHL | 69 | 28 | 38 | 66 | 40 | 11 | 3 | 8 | 11 | 14 |
| 1985–86 | Maine Mariners | AHL | 80 | 31 | 55 | 86 | 34 | 5 | 2 | 3 | 5 | 2 |
| 1986–87 | Maine Mariners | AHL | 80 | 24 | 41 | 65 | 73 | — | — | — | — | — |
| 1987–88 | Maine Mariners | AHL | 12 | 2 | 8 | 10 | 10 | 10 | 2 | 4 | 6 | 24 |
| 1987–88 | Utica Devils | AHL | 54 | 15 | 32 | 47 | 55 | — | — | — | — | — |
| 1988–89 | Maine Mariners | AHL | 79 | 15 | 41 | 56 | 67 | — | — | — | — | — |
| 1989–90 | Maine Mariners | AHL | 8 | 2 | 4 | 6 | 10 | — | — | — | — | — |
| 1989–90 | HC Gherdëina | ITA II | 29 | 30 | 47 | 77 | 22 | — | — | — | — | — |
| 1989–90 | HC Lugano | NDA | — | — | — | — | — | 7 | 4 | 6 | 10 | 12 |
| 1990–91 | HC Bülach | CHE II | 35 | 25 | 26 | 51 | 64 | — | — | — | — | — |
| 1991–92 | HC Bülach | CHE II | 33 | 13 | 29 | 42 | 32 | 10 | 5 | 6 | 11 | 15 |
| 1992–93 | HC Davos | CHE II | 36 | 17 | 31 | 48 | 8 | 7 | 7 | 6 | 13 | 6 |
| 1993–94 | HC Davos | NDA | 36 | 10 | 14 | 24 | 20 | 4 | 0 | 3 | 3 | 2 |
| 1994–95 | Kokudo Ice Hockey Club | JPN | 29 | 12 | 20 | 32 | 10 | — | — | — | — | — |
| 1995–96 | Kokudo Ice Hockey Club | JPN | 36 | 18 | 22 | 40 | 36 | — | — | — | — | — |
| 1996–97 | Kokudo Ice Hockey Club | JPN | 29 | 6 | 13 | 19 | 26 | — | — | — | — | — |
| 1997–98 | Kokudo Ice Hockey Club | JPN | 10 | 3 | 6 | 9 | — | — | — | — | — | — |
| AHL totals | | | 538 | 156 | 326 | 482 | 362 | 44 | 14 | 22 | 36 | 50 |
| CHE II totals | | | 104 | 55 | 86 | 141 | 104 | 17 | 12 | 12 | 24 | 21 |
| JPN totals | | | 104 | 39 | 61 | 100 | 72 | — | — | — | — | — |

=== International ===
| Year | Team | Event | GP | G | A | Pts | PIM |
|---|---|---|---|---|---|---|---|
| 1998 | Japan | OG | 4 | 0 | 0 | 0 | 6 |
