= Barry MacKenzie =

Canadian ice hockey player and coach

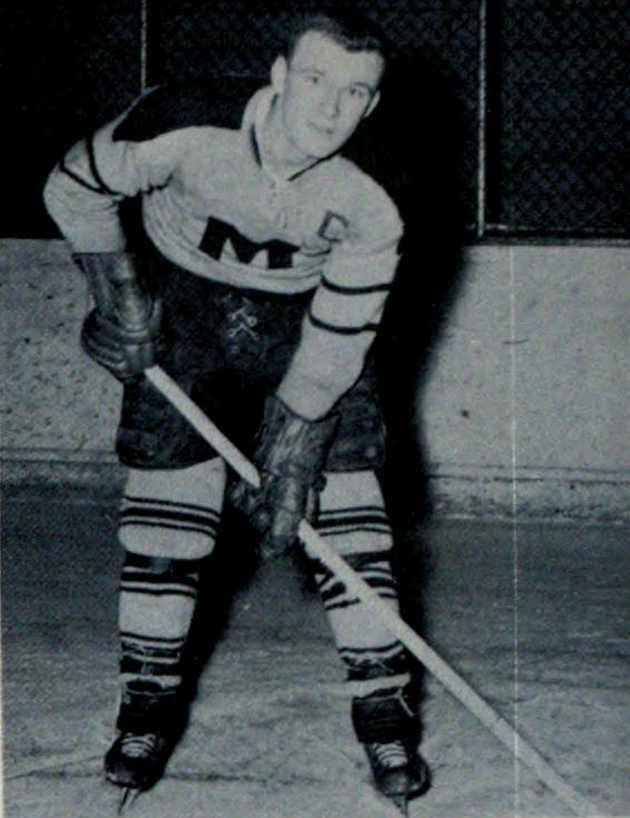
- at St. Michael's College, c. 1962
- Born: August 16, 1941 (age 84) Toronto, Ontario, Canada
- Height: 6 ft 0 in (183 cm)
- Weight: 190 lb (86 kg; 13 st 8 lb)
- Position: Defence
- Shot: Left
- Played for: Minnesota North Stars
- National team: Canada
- Playing career: 1960–1970

Barry MacKenzie
Medal record

Representing Canada

Olympic Games
Bronze medal – third place	1968 Grenoble	

World Championships
Bronze medal – third place	1966 Yugoslavia	
Bronze medal – third place	1967 Austria	

John Barry MacKenzie (born August 16, 1941) is a Canadian retired ice hockey player. He played for Canada at the 1964 and 1968 Winter Olympics, winning one bronze medal in 1968, as well as in three World Championships, winning a further two more bronzes. He would also play 6 games in the National Hockey League with the Minnesota North Stars during the 1968–69 season.

After his retirement, MacKenzie became the first coach hired by the Sudbury Wolves of the Ontario Hockey Association and became principal and coach at the Athol Murray College of Notre Dame in Wilcox, Saskatchewan. He eventually worked with the Minnesota Wild as a player development coordinator.

He was inducted into the International Ice Hockey Federation Hall of Fame in 1999.

MacKenzie has coached three Stanley Cup winning coaches: Rod Brind'Amour, Jon Cooper, and Barry Trotz.

== Career ==
At the age of 15, MacKenzie played for the Weston Dukes with the goal of joining the Toronto Marlies before he was encouraged by Father David Bauer to attend St. Michael's College School. He played at St. Michael during the 1960–61 season where they captured the Memorial Cup. After the teams Memorial Cup run, Father David Bauer became the head coach of the University of British Columbia men's ice hockey team, the UBC Thunderbirds. For the 1962–1963 season, MacKenzie, along with Ken Broderick, Dave Chambers, and Terry O'Malley enrolled at the University of British Columbia where they played for the UBC Thunderbirds.

From there he joined the Canadian National Team for the 1964 Winter Olympics and 1968 Winter Olympics, winning one bronze medal. He earned the chance to turn professional by playing six games with the Minnesota North Stars in the National Hockey League but failed to make the roster full-time.

He joined the Sudbury Wolves of the Ontario Hockey Association as a coach but lasted only half a season. In 1974, he moved to Japan for three seasons to play with the Seibu Ice Hockey Club but eventually returned to Canada to coach the Athol Murray College of Notre Dame hockey team. Alongside Terry O'Malley, MacKenzie redefined their midget hockey program and guided them to the 1988 Air Canada Cup Championship. In 1992, MacKenzie was named president of Notre Dame College. MacKenzie eventually left Notre Dame to work with the Minnesota Wild as their player development coordinator.

In 1999, MacKenzie was inducted into the International Ice Hockey Federation Hall of Fame. In 2016, he was inducted into The Saskatchewan Hockey Hall of Fame as a builder.

== Personal life ==
MacKenzie earned his Bachelor of Education from the University of British Columbia and a Master of Science from Eastern Michigan University. The 1962–63 University of British Columbia men's ice hockey team was inducted into the UBC Sports Hall of Fame in 2012.

== Career statistics ==
=== Regular season and playoffs ===
			Regular season					Playoffs
Season	Team	League	GP	G	A	Pts	PIM	GP	G	A	Pts	PIM
1960–61	Toronto St. Michael's Majors	OHA	9	1	4	5	8	14	0	4	4	8
1960–61	Toronto St. Michael's Majors	M-Cup	—	—	—	—	—	9	1	1	2	16
1961–62	St. Michael's Majors	OHA	18	5	9	14	58	11	0	4	4	14
1961–62	Toronto St. Michael's Majors	M-Cup	—	—	—	—	—	5	0	1	1	20
1962–63	University of British Columbia	WUAA	—	—	—	—	—	—	—	—	—	—
1963–64	Canadian National Team	Exhib	—	—	—	—	—	—	—	—	—	—
1964–65	Canadian National Team	Exhib	—	—	—	—	—	—	—	—	—	—
1965–66	Canadian National Team	Exhib	—	—	—	—	—	—	—	—	—	—
1966–67	Canadian National Team	Exhib	—	—	—	—	—	—	—	—	—	—
1967–68	Ottawa Nationals	OHA Sr	23	2	9	11	40	—	—	—	—	—
1968–69	Minnesota North Stars	NHL	6	0	1	1	6	—	—	—	—	—
1968–69	Memphis South Stars	CHL	57	5	16	21	54	—	—	—	—	—
1969–70	Seibu Tetsudo	JIHL	—	—	—	—	—	—	—	—	—	—
1975–76	Seibu Tetsudo	JIHL	—	—	—	—	—	—	—	—	—	—
1976–77	Seibu Tetsudo	JIHL	—	—	—	—	—	—	—	—	—	—
1977–78	Seibu Tetsudo	JIHL	—	—	—	—	—	—	—	—	—	—
NHL totals			6	0	1	1	6	—	—	—	—	—

=== International ===
Year	Team	Event	GP	G	A	Pts	PIM
1964	Canada	OLY	7	0	2	2	4
1965	Canada	WC	7	2	1	3	8
1966	Canada	WC	7	0	4	4	6
1967	Canada	WC	7	0	0	0	12
1968	Canada	OLY	7	0	2	2	8
Senior totals			35	2	7	11	38
