= Anatoli Fedotov =

Russian ice hockey player (born 1966)

- Born: May 11, 1966 (age 60) Saratov, Soviet Union
- Height: 5 ft 11 in (180 cm)
- Weight: 179 lb (81 kg; 12 st 11 lb)
- Position: Defence
- Shot: Left
- Played for: Winnipeg Jets; Mighty Ducks of Anaheim
- National team: Soviet Union and Russia
- NHL draft: 238th overall, 1993; Mighty Ducks of Anaheim
- Playing career: 1985–2001

Anatoli Vladimirovich Fedotov (Russian: Анатолий Владимирович Федотов; born May 11, 1966) is a Russian former professional ice hockey player who played four games in the National Hockey League.

== Career ==
He began his career with his hometown team Kristall Saratov before moving to the Soviet Hockey League with HC Dynamo Moscow. He represented the USSR in the 1985 and 1986 World Junior Ice Hockey Championships. He also played on the Soviet Union's 1987 Canada Cup team. He then moved to North America in 1992 and played one game for the Winnipeg Jets, scoring two assists. He spent the season in the American Hockey League with the Moncton Hawks. Though he’d already played one game in the NHL, he was ruled ineligible for the rest of the season due to only signing an AHL contract and was made available for the 1993 draft. He was then drafted 238th overall by the Mighty Ducks of Anaheim in the 1993 NHL entry draft and managed to play three regular season games but didn't register a point. He spent two seasons in the International Hockey League with the San Diego Gulls before moving to Japan, signing with New Oji Seishi Tomakomai where he was voted the league's best player. He then played in Finland's SM-liiga with Tappara and Sweden's Elitserien with HV71 before returning to Oji. After two seasons in Japan, Fedotov returned to Russia and split 2000-01 with Molot-Prikamie Perm and Vityaz Podolsk before retiring.

He has the distinction of being the only NHL player to be selected in the NHL Entry Draft after playing his first NHL game.

== Career statistics ==
=== Regular season and playoffs ===
			Regular season					Playoffs
Season	Team	League	GP	G	A	Pts	PIM	GP	G	A	Pts	PIM
1982–83	Kristall Saratov	USSR II	3	0	0	0	—	4	0	0	0	0
1983–84	Kristall Saratov	USSR II	10	1	—	—	—	—	—	—	—	—
1984–85	Kristall Saratov	USSR II	41	4	2	6	31	—	—	—	—	—
1985–86	Dynamo Moscow	USSR	35	0	2	2	10	—	—	—	—	—
1986–87	Dynamo Moscow	USSR	18	3	2	5	12	—	—	—	—	—
1987–88	Dynamo Moscow	USSR	48	2	3	5	38	—	—	—	—	—
1988–89	Dynamo Moscow	USSR	40	2	1	3	24	—	—	—	—	—
1989–90	Dynamo Moscow	USSR	41	2	4	6	22	—	—	—	—	—
1990–91	Dynamo Moscow II	USSR III	1	0	0	0	0	—	—	—	—	—
1991–92	Dynamo Moscow II	CIS III	40	4	7	11	42	—	—	—	—	—
1991–92	Dynamo Moscow	CIS	5	0	0	0	4	5	1	0	1	4
1992–93	Winnipeg Jets	NHL	1	0	2	2	0	—	—	—	—	—
1992–93	Moncton Hawks	AHL	76	10	37	47	99	2	0	0	0	0
1993–94	Mighty Ducks of Anaheim	NHL	3	0	0	0	0	—	—	—	—	—
1993–94	San Diego Gulls	IHL	66	14	12	26	42	8	0	1	1	6
1994–95	San Diego Gulls	IHL	53	5	12	17	16	—	—	—	—	—
1995–96	Oji Eagles	JPN	32	20	17	37	—	—	—	—	—	—
1996–97	Tappara	SM-l	44	9	9	18	62	3	0	0	0	4
1997–98	HV71	SEL	24	0	1	1	44	4	0	0	0	4
1998–99	Oji Eagles	JPN	38	7	23	30	76	6	0	6	6	0
1999–00	Oji Eagles	JPN	17	2	6	8	—	3	0	0	0	2
2000–01	Vityaz Podolsk	RSL	15	0	1	1	4	—	—	—	—	—
2000–01	Molot-Prikamie Perm	RSL	13	0	0	0	2	—	—	—	—	—
USSR/CIS totals			187	9	12	21	110	5	1	0	1	4
IHL totals			119	19	24	43	58	8	0	1	1	6
JPN totals			87	29	46	75	—	9	0	6	6	2

=== International ===
Year	Team	Event	GP	G	A	Pts	PIM
1983	Soviet Union	EJC	5	1	0	1	16
1984	Soviet Union	EJC	5	0	0	0	6
1985	Soviet Union	WJC	6	0	2	2	2
1986	Soviet Union	WJC	7	1	5	6	0
1987	Soviet Union	CC	8	0	1	1	4
1997	Russia	WC	9	2	2	4	10
Junior totals			23	2	7	9	24
Senior totals			17	2	3	5	14
