= Greg Parks =

Canadian ice hockey player

- Born: March 25, 1967 Edmonton, Alberta, Canada
- Died: June 16, 2015 (aged 48) Edmonton, Alberta, Canada
- Height: 5 ft 10 in (178 cm)
- Weight: 169 lb (77 kg; 12 st 1 lb)
- Position: Right wing
- Shot: Right
- Played for: New York Islanders; Leksands IF; Krefelder EV 1981; Brynäs IF; SC Langnau; HC Fribourg–Gottéron; IF Björklöven; Oji Eagles
- National team: Canada
- NHL draft: Undrafted
- Playing career: 1989–2003
Medal record
Men's Ice hockey
Silver medal – second place	1994 Lillehammer	Ice hockey

Gregory Roy Parks (March 25, 1967 – June 16, 2015) was a Canadian professional ice hockey player. He won a silver medal at the 1994 Winter Olympics. He also played 23 games in the National Hockey League with the New York Islanders.

== Awards and honours ==
Award	Year
AJHL co-MVP	1984-85
All-CCHA First Team	1988–89
AHCA West First-Team All-American	1988–89
AHL Calder Cup champion	1989-90
Silver medal (Ice Hockey, 1994 Winter Olympics)	1994
Nationalliga B champion	1997-98

== Career statistics ==
=== Regular season and playoffs ===
			Regular season					Playoffs
Season	Team	League	GP	G	A	Pts	PIM	GP	G	A	Pts	PIM
1983–84	St. Albert Saints	AJHL	58	35	40	75	224	—	—	—	—	—
1984–85	St. Albert Saints	AJHL	48	36	74	110	91	—	—	—	—	—
1985–86	Bowling Green Falcons	CCHA	41	16	26	42	43	—	—	—	—	—
1986–87	Bowling Green Falcons	CCHA	45	23	27	50	52	—	—	—	—	—
1987–88	Bowling Green Falcons	CCHA	45	30	44	74	86	—	—	—	—	—
1988–89	Bowling Green Falcons	CCHA	47	32	42	74	96	—	—	—	—	—
1989–90	Kärpät	FIN.2	16	4	6	10	22	—	—	—	—	—
1989–90	Springfield Indians	AHL	49	22	32	54	30	18	9	13	22	22
1989–90	Johnstown Chiefs	ECHL	8	5	9	14	7	—	—	—	—	—
1990–91	New York Islanders	NHL	20	1	2	3	4	—	—	—	—	—
1990–91	Capital District Islanders	AHL	48	32	43	75	67	—	—	—	—	—
1991–92	New York Islanders	NHL	1	0	0	0	2	—	—	—	—	—
1991–92	Capital District Islanders	AHL	70	36	57	93	84	7	5	8	13	4
1992–93	Canada	Intl	9	2	2	4	4	—	—	—	—	—
1992–93	Leksands IF	SEL	39	21	18	39	66	1	0	0	0	4
1992–93	New York Islanders	NHL	2	0	0	0	0	2	0	0	0	0
1993–94	Canada	Intl	21	2	3	5	122	—	—	—	—	—
1993–94	Leksands IF	SEL	39	21	18	39	44	4	3	1	4	4
1994–95	Krefelder EV 1981	DEL	10	2	7	9	8	1	0	0	0	0
1995–96	Canada	Intl	7	0	0	0	6	—	—	—	—	—
1995–96	Brynäs IF	SEL	22	10	12	22	22	—	—	—	—	—
1995–96	Brynäs IF	Allsv	18	4	14	18	45	10	3	4	7	6
1996–97	SC Langnau	SUI.2	42	36	40	76	53	8	5	5	10	39
1997–98	SC Langnau	SUI.2	40	30	40	70	56	16	9	8	17	30
1998–99	SC Langnau	NDA	29	13	24	37	26	—	—	—	—	—
1999–2000	Leksands IF	SEL	36	16	13	29	52	—	—	—	—	—
1999–2000	Canada	Intl	4	1	3	4	0	—	—	—	—	—
2000–01	Leksands IF	SEL	11	5	3	8	10	—	—	—	—	—
2000–01	HC Fribourg–Gottéron	NLA	17	7	8	15	12	1	1	0	1	4
2001–02	IF Björklöven	Allsv	45	22	24	46	102	8	6	5	11	14
2002–03	Oji Eagles	JPN	32	18	32	50	—	—	—	—	—	—
2003–04	Oji Eagles	JPN	24	14	15	29	36	—	—	—	—	—
2003–04	Oji Eagles	ALH	14	6	11	17	32	—	—	—	—	—
AHL totals			167	90	132	222	181	24	14	21	35	26
NHL totals			23	1	2	3	6	2	0	0	0	0
SEL totals			147	73	64	137	194	5	3	1	4	8

=== International ===
Year	Team	Event	GP	G	A	Pts	PIM
1994	Canada	OG	8	1	2	3	10
Senior totals			8	1	2	3	10
