= Gregg Boddy =

Canadian ice hockey player (1949–2026)

- Born: March 19, 1949 Ponoka, Alberta, Canada
- Died: October 15, 2026 (aged 77)
- Height: 6 ft 2 in (188 cm)
- Weight: 200 lb (91 kg; 14 st 4 lb)
- Position: Defence
- Shot: Left
- Played for: NHL; Vancouver Canucks; WHA; San Diego Mariners; Edmonton Oilers
- NHL draft: 27th overall, 1969; Los Angeles Kings
- Playing career: 1969–1979

Gregg Allan Boddy (March 19, 1949 – October 15, 2026) was a Canadian professional ice hockey defenceman who spent five seasons with the Vancouver Canucks of the National Hockey League between 1971 and 1976. He also played briefly in the World Hockey Association for the San Diego Mariners and Edmonton Oilers. Boddy concluded his hockey career with two seasons in the Japan Ice Hockey League, retiring in 1979.

== Playing career ==
After a junior career with the Edmonton Oil Kings, Boddy was selected 27th overall in the 1969 NHL Amateur Draft by the Los Angeles Kings. He spent one season in the minors in the Kings' system before being dealt to the Montreal Canadiens in a six-player trade in 1970. On a deep Montreal team, he was similarly stuck in the AHL and was dealt to the Vancouver Canucks for a draft pick in 1971.

Boddy made his NHL debut in 1971–72, as he was called up mid-season from the Rochester Americans, and made a positive impression with his reliable defensive play. He finished the year with 2 goals and 7 points in 40 games and established himself as a regular on the Canucks' blueline. In 1972–73, he appeared in 74 games for the Canucks, posting 3 goals and 11 assists for 14 points.

1973–74 was a disappointment, as he appeared in only 53 games and was briefly reassigned to the minors. However, he bounced back strongly in 1974–75 to have his best season as Vancouver won their division and made the playoffs for the first time in their history. Boddy finished the season with a career-high 11 goals, which was an individual feat for the usually stay-at-home Boddy who had scored a total of 16 goals in the previous eight seasons combined dating back to junior. He also contributed 12 assists for a total of 23 points, along with 56 penalty minutes as he saw the only NHL playoff action of his career, appearing in 3 games as the Canucks were knocked out early.

However, Boddy's career stalled in 1975–76, as he lost his regular place on the Canucks' blueline and was reassigned to the minors. He jumped to the rival WHA for the 1976–77 season, joining the San Diego Mariners, but after a month in San Diego he was dealt to his hometown Edmonton Oilers, finishing the year with 2 goals and 19 assists for 21 points in 64 games.

He spent two more seasons playing in the Japan Ice Hockey League for Oji Seishi before retiring in 1979. He finished his career with totals of 23 goals and 44 assists for 67 points in 273 NHL games, along with 263 penalty minutes.

== Later life and death ==
Boddy died on October 15, 2026, at the age of 77.

== Career statistics ==
=== Regular season and playoffs ===
			Regular season					Playoffs
Season	Team	League	GP	G	A	Pts	PIM	GP	G	A	Pts	PIM
1966–67	Edmonton Oil Kings	CMJHL	55	1	5	6	42	9	0	1	1	12
1967–68	Edmonton Oil Kings	WCHL	59	3	14	17	101	13	1	1	2	20
1968–69	Edmonton Oil Kings	WCHL	59	1	21	22	119	17	0	7	7	17
1969–70	Springfield Kings	AHL	68	2	9	11	70	14	0	3	3	14
1970–71	Montreal Voyageurs	AHL	63	0	17	17	108	3	0	0	0	0
1971–72	Vancouver Canucks	NHL	40	2	5	7	45	—	—	—	—	—
1971–72	Rochester Americans	AHL	28	2	6	8	77	—	—	—	—	—
1972–73	Vancouver Canucks	NHL	74	3	11	14	70	—	—	—	—	—
1973–74	Vancouver Canucks	NHL	53	2	10	12	59	—	—	—	—	—
1973–74	Seattle Totems	WHL	4	0	1	1	0	—	—	—	—	—
1974–75	Vancouver Canucks	NHL	72	11	12	23	56	3	0	0	0	0
1975–76	Vancouver Canucks	NHL	34	5	6	11	33	—	—	—	—	—
1975–76	Tulsa Oilers	CHL	24	0	9	9	29	9	0	2	2	19
1976–77	San Diego Mariners	WHA	18	1	2	3	19	—	—	—	—	—
1976–77	Edmonton Oilers	WHA	46	1	17	18	41	4	1	2	3	14
1977–78	Oji Seishi	JIHL	—	—	—	—	—	—	—	—	—	—
1978–79	Oji Seishi	JIHL	20	6	10	16	44	—	—	—	—	—
WHA totals			64	2	19	21	60	4	1	2	3	14
NHL totals			273	23	44	67	263	3	0	0	0	0
