= John Tucker (ice hockey) =

Canadian ice hockey player (born 1964)

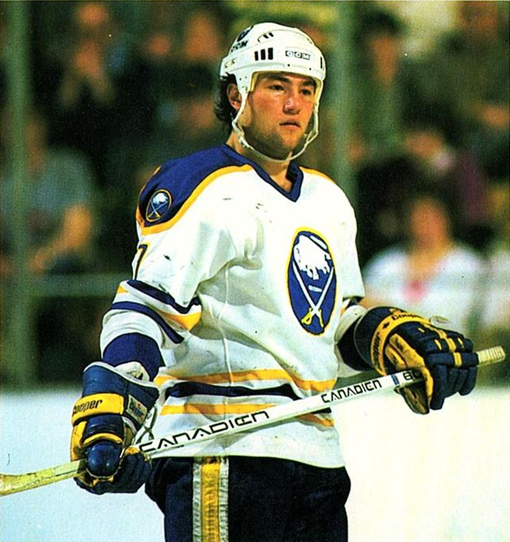
- Born: September 29, 1964 (age 62) Windsor, Ontario, Canada
- Height: 6 ft 1 in (185 cm)
- Weight: 185 lb (84 kg; 13 st 3 lb)
- Position: Centre
- Shot: Right
- Played for: Buffalo Sabres; Washington Capitals; New York Islanders; Tampa Bay Lightning
- NHL draft: 31st overall, 1983; Buffalo Sabres
- Playing career: 1983–1996

John G. Tucker (born September 29, 1964) is a Canadian former professional ice hockey centre who played twelve seasons in the National Hockey League in the 1980s and 1990s, most notably with the Buffalo Sabres and the Tampa Bay Lightning, scoring 177 goals and 259 assists in 656 career regular season games and a further 28 points in 31 play-off games. He played several more seasons in Italy and Japan as well.

== Playing career ==
Tucker was drafted 31st overall by Buffalo in the 1983 NHL entry draft having played junior for the Kitchener Rangers where he won the Memorial Cup in 1982. He played for Buffalo from 1983 through 1989. He was acquired by the Washington Capitals on January 5, 1990. Rejoining the Sabres the following season, following an off season trade from Washington, he was again traded, this time to the New York Islanders. The following season, Tucker joined HC Asiago of the Italian League, scoring 88 points in 36 games and winning the Trofeo Gazzetino for MVP of the league . Tucker returned to the NHL in 1992, when he joined expansion franchise Tampa Bay, playing four seasons with the Lightning.

In 1996–97 season, Tucker returned to Italy, playing for HC Milano Saima. The following three seasons John played in Japan for Kokudo Keikaku.

== Coaching career ==
Since 2006, Tucker has served as an advisor and interim coach for his former Italian team H.C. Asiago. In 2010, Tucker was named head coach and led the team to two consecutive league championships and a Continental Cup final. Tucker recently completed his third season coaching H.C. Asiago.

On April 17, 2014, Tucker was named head coach of the Buffalo Junior Sabres Junior A team of the Ontario Junior Hockey League.

== Personal life ==
Tucker is the nephew of former Ottawa Rough Riders wide receiver Whit Tucker.

Wife, Lynn Serio from Buffalo, NY.

Children Paige and Jack.

== Career statistics ==
=== Regular season and playoffs ===
			Regular season					Playoffs
Season	Team	League	GP	G	A	Pts	PIM	GP	G	A	Pts	PIM
1981–82	Kitchener Rangers	OHL	67	16	32	48	32	15	2	3	5	2
1982–83	Kitchener Rangers	OHL	70	60	80	140	33	11	5	9	14	10
1983–84	Kitchener Rangers	OHL	39	40	60	100	25	12	12	18	30	8
1983–84	Buffalo Sabres	NHL	21	12	4	16	4	3	1	0	1	0
1984–85	Buffalo Sabres	NHL	64	22	27	49	21	5	1	5	6	0
1985–86	Buffalo Sabres	NHL	75	31	34	65	39	—	—	—	—	—
1986–87	Buffalo Sabres	NHL	54	17	34	51	21	—	—	—	—	—
1987–88	Buffalo Sabres	NHL	45	19	19	38	20	6	7	3	10	18
1988–89	Buffalo Sabres	NHL	60	13	31	44	31	3	0	3	3	0
1989–90	Buffalo Sabres	NHL	8	1	2	3	2	—	—	—	—	—
1989–90	Washington Capitals	NHL	38	9	19	28	10	12	1	7	8	0
1990–91	Buffalo Sabres	NHL	18	1	3	4	4	—	—	—	—	—
1990–91	New York Islanders	NHL	20	3	4	7	4	—	—	—	—	—
1991–92	Asiago HC	Italy-A	18	16	21	37	6	—	—	—	—	—
1992–93	Tampa Bay Lightning	NHL	78	17	39	56	69	—	—	—	—	—
1993–94	Tampa Bay Lightning	NHL	66	17	23	40	28	—	—	—	—	—
1994–95	Tampa Bay Lightning	NHL	46	12	13	25	14	—	—	—	—	—
1995–96	Tampa Bay Lightning	NHL	63	3	7	10	18	2	0	0	0	2
1996–97	HC Milano Saima	Italy-A	30	12	29	41	88	—	—	—	—	—
1997–98	Kokudo Keikaku	JPN	39	27	47	74	53	—	—	—	—	—
1998–99	Kokudo Keikaku	JPN	23	21	20	41	30	—	—	—	—	—
1999–00	Kokudo Keikaku	JPN	24	14	22	36	0	—	—	—	—	—
NHL totals			656	177	259	436	285	31	10	18	28	20
