= 1992–93 Japan Ice Hockey League season =

Ice hockey league season

The 1992–93 Japan Ice Hockey League season was the 27th season of the Japan Ice Hockey League. Six teams participated in the league, and Kokudo Ice Hockey Club won the championship.

== Regular season ==
	Team	GP	W	L	T	GF	GA	Pts
1.	Kokudo Ice Hockey Club	30	22	1	7	124	56	51
2.	Oji Seishi Hockey	30	20	8	2	142	78	42
3.	Seibu Tetsudo	30	19	8	3	97	58	41
4.	Jujo Ice Hockey Club	30	10	18	2	79	117	22
5.	Sapporo Snow Brand	30	7	19	4	58	95	18
6.	Furukawa Ice Hockey Club	30	2	26	2	52	148	6

== Final ==
- Oji Seishi Hockey - Kokudo Ice Hockey Club 1:3 (4:5 SO, 4:5 OT, 4:2, 1:2 OT)
