= 1993–94 Japan Ice Hockey League season =

The 1993–94 Japan Ice Hockey League season was the 28th season of the Japan Ice Hockey League. Six teams participated in the league, and the Shin Oji Seishi won the championship.

== Regular season ==
	Team	GP	W	L	T	GF	GA	Pts
1.	Kokudo Ice Hockey Club	30	24	5	1	140	66	49
2.	Shin Oji Seishi	30	22	6	2	136	76	46
3.	Seibu Tetsudo	30	15	11	4	90	89	34
4.	Nippon Paper Cranes	30	12	17	1	95	121	25
5.	Sapporo Snow Brand	30	6	19	5	69	109	17
6.	Furukawa Ice Hockey Club	30	3	24	3	58	127	9

== Playoffs ==
=== Semifinals ===
- Shin Oji Seishi - Seibu Tetsudo 3:0 (5:1, 4:2, 3:2)

=== Final ===
- Kokudo Ice Hockey Club - Shin Oji Seishi 1:3 (2:5, 5:4, 2:3, 2:4)
