= Randy Gregg (ice hockey) =

Canadian ice hockey defenceman

- Born: February 19, 1956 (age 70) Edmonton, Alberta, Canada
- Height: 6 ft 4 in (193 cm)
- Weight: 215 lb (98 kg; 15 st 5 lb)
- Position: Defence
- Shot: Left
- Played for: Edmonton Oilers; Vancouver Canucks
- National team: Canada
- NHL draft: Undrafted
- Playing career: 1981–1992

Randall John Gregg (born February 19, 1956) is a Canadian physician and former professional ice hockey defenceman who spent 10 seasons in the National Hockey League. He is best known for his time with the Edmonton Oilers, where he spent most of his career and won five Stanley Cups, in 1984, 1985, 1987, 1988 and 1990.

== Early life ==
Gregg was born in Edmonton. He attended the University of Alberta to work toward a medical degree, and playing hockey was a secondary priority. However, he became one of the top players in Canadian university hockey, leading the Golden Bears to two Canadian Interuniversity Athletics Union (CIAU) championships, and was CIAU Player of the Year in 1979.

== Career ==
Gregg received a contract offer from the New York Rangers but rejected it to spend the year with David Bauer and the Canadian national team, and captained Canada's entry at the 1980 Winter Olympics in Lake Placid.

Following the 1980 Olympics, Gregg signed in Japan as a player-coach and spent two full seasons playing there. He was at last convinced to accept an NHL offer by his hometown Edmonton Oilers, and joined the team for the 1982 playoffs, appearing in four games.

In 1982–83, Gregg emerged as a regular on the Oilers' blueline, appearing in all 80 games and registering 6 goals and 28 points. Receiving as much notoriety from the fact that he had a medical degree as he did for his solid play on the blueline, he helped the Oilers reach the Stanley Cup finals in 1983. In 1983–84, he would have his finest NHL season, as he recorded career highs of 12 goals and 40 points, and then contributed 10 points in 19 playoff games to help Edmonton win their first Stanley Cup. Following the season, he was selected to represent Canada at the 1984 Canada Cup tournament.

Gregg retired after the Oilers' disappointing loss in the 1986 playoffs but returned to the team six weeks into the season and helped Edmonton win their third championship in 1986–87. He retired from professional hockey again after the 1987–88 campaign to enter a residency program in orthopedic surgery and to represent Canada at the 1988 Winter Olympics, but re-joined Edmonton for the playoffs to win another Stanley Cup.

Gregg spent two more years with the Oilers as a depth defender, helping the team win their fifth Stanley Cup in seven years in 1990. He was one of seven players to play for all five championship teams. Exposed in the 1990 NHL Waiver Draft, he was claimed by the Vancouver Canucks but decided again to retire. However, after a year away from the sport, he signed with the Canucks for the 1991–92 campaign, appearing in 21 games, before retiring for good following the season.

Gregg appeared in 474 NHL games, recording 41 goals and 152 assists for 193 points along with 333 penalty minutes. He also appeared in 137 playoff games, totaling 13 goals and 40 assists for 53 points.

Following his retirement, Gregg completed his residency training program at the University of Alberta Faculty of Medicine and Dentistry. He is a family physician, operating a successful sports medicine practice in Edmonton. He briefly worked at TSN as the third string colour commentator for NHL games in 1994–95.

== Personal life ==
Gregg married American-born Canadian Olympic speed-skater Kathy Vogt on June 9, 1984, in Edmonton. They have four children, including speed-skaters Jessica Gregg and Jamie Gregg. Gregg and his family reside in Edmonton, Alberta. His brother, Gary, is a former member of the Edmonton Investors Group (EIG), the limited partnership that owned the Edmonton Oilers.

In 2024 he was awarded an honorary doctor of science degree from the University of Alberta "as a physician, philanthropist and role model".

== Legacy ==
The Dr. Randy Gregg Award is presented annually by Canadian Interuniversity Sport (CIS) to reward excellence in the student-athlete. The Canadian University ice hockey player who receives this award has exhibited outstanding achievement in ice hockey, academics, and community involvement.

== Awards and achievements ==
- 1983–84 - NHL - Stanley Cup (Edmonton)
- 1984–85 - NHL - Stanley Cup (Edmonton)
- 1986–87 - NHL - Stanley Cup (Edmonton)
- 1987–88 - NHL - Stanley Cup (Edmonton)
- 1989–90 - NHL - Stanley Cup (Edmonton)

== Career statistics ==
=== Regular season and playoffs ===
			Regular season					Playoffs
Season	Team	League	GP	G	A	Pts	PIM	GP	G	A	Pts	PIM
1975–76	University of Alberta	CWUAA	31	3	20	23	49	—	—	—	—	—
1976–77	University of Alberta	CWUAA	34	10	23	33	45	—	—	—	—	—
1977–78	University of Alberta	CWUAA	30	8	26	34	43	—	—	—	—	—
1978–79	University of Alberta	CWUAA	41	11	26	37	67	—	—	—	—	—
1979–80	Canada	Intl	56	7	17	24	36	—	—	—	—	—
1980–81	Kokudo Keikaku	JPN	35	12	18	30	30	—	—	—	—	—
1981–82	Kokudo Keikaku	JPN	36	12	20	32	25	—	—	—	—	—
1981–82	Edmonton Oilers	NHL	—	—	—	—	—	4	0	0	0	0
1982–83	Edmonton Oilers	NHL	80	6	22	28	54	16	2	4	6	13
1983–84	Edmonton Oilers	NHL	80	13	27	40	56	19	3	7	10	21
1984–85	Edmonton Oilers	NHL	57	3	20	23	32	17	0	6	6	12
1985–86	Edmonton Oilers	NHL	64	2	26	28	47	10	1	0	1	12
1986–87	Edmonton Oilers	NHL	52	8	16	24	42	18	3	6	9	17
1987–88	Canada	Intl	37	2	6	8	37	—	—	—	—	—
1987–88	Edmonton Oilers	NHL	15	1	2	3	8	19	1	8	9	24
1988–89	Edmonton Oilers	NHL	57	3	15	18	28	7	1	0	1	4
1989–90	Edmonton Oilers	NHL	48	4	20	24	42	20	2	6	8	16
1991–92	Vancouver Canucks	NHL	21	1	4	5	24	7	0	1	1	8
NHL totals			474	41	152	193	333	137	13	38	51	127

=== International ===
Year	Team	Event	GP	G	A	Pts	PIM
1980	Canada	OLY	6	1	1	2	2
1984	Canada	CC	3	0	1	1	4
1988	Canada	OLY	8	1	2	3	8
Senior totals			17	2	4	6	14
