= 1972–73 Japan Ice Hockey League season =

Seventh season of the Japan Ice Hockey League

The 1972–73 Japan Ice Hockey League season was the seventh season of the Japan Ice Hockey League. Five teams participated in the league, and the Seibu Tetsudo won the championship.

== Regular season ==
	Team	GP	W	L	T	GF	GA	Pts
1.	Seibu Tetsudo	12	10	2	0	98	31	20
2.	Oji Seishi Hockey	12	7	3	2	58	34	16
3.	Kokudo Keikaku	12	7	5	0	50	45	14
4.	Iwakura Ice Hockey Club	12	4	6	2	61	48	10
5.	Furukawa Ice Hockey Club	12	0	12	0	28	137	0
