= 1985–86 Japan Ice Hockey League season =

The 1985–86 Japan Ice Hockey League season was the 20th season of the Japan Ice Hockey League. Six teams participated in the league, and Kokudo Keikaku won the championship.

== Regular season ==
	Team	GP	W	L	T	GF	GA	Pts
1.	Kokudo Keikaku	30	19	7	4	131	87	42
2.	Oji Seishi Hockey	30	18	7	5	154	108	41
3.	Sapporo Snow Brand	30	16	12	2	112	92	34
4.	Seibu Tetsudo	30	12	12	6	103	122	30
5.	Jujo Ice Hockey Club	30	10	17	3	101	128	23
6.	Furukawa Ice Hockey Club	30	4	24	2	56	120	10
