= 1991–92 Japan Ice Hockey League season =

The 1991–92 Japan Ice Hockey League season was the 26th season of the Japan Ice Hockey League. Six teams participated in the league, and Kokudo Ice Hockey Club won the championship.

== Regular season ==
	Team	GP	W	L	T	GF	GA	Pts
1.	Kokudo Ice Hockey Club	30	22	5	3	178	77	47
2.	Oji Seishi Hockey	30	22	6	2	155	73	46
3.	Sapporo Snow Brand	30	16	13	1	115	103	33
4.	Seibu Tetsudo	30	14	15	1	81	107	29
5.	Jujo Ice Hockey Club	30	10	19	1	102	128	21
6.	Furukawa Ice Hockey Club	30	2	28	0	47	190	4

== Final ==
- Oji Seishi Hockey - Kokudo Ice Hockey Club 1:3 (5:7, 2:3, 3:2, 1:2)
