= 1974–75 Japan Ice Hockey League season =

The 1974–75 Japan Ice Hockey League season was the ninth season of the Japan Ice Hockey League. Six teams participated in the league. Kokudo Keikaku won the championship for the first time.

== Regular season ==
	Team	GP	W	L	T	GF	GA	Pts
1.	Kokudo Keikaku	10	8	1	1	63	22	17
2.	Seibu Tetsudo	10	7	2	1	51	16	15
3.	Oji Seishi Hockey	10	6	4	0	76	37	12
4.	Iwakura Ice Hockey Club	10	6	4	0	45	32	12
5.	Jujo Ice Hockey Club	10	1	9	0	20	76	2
6.	Furukawa Ice Hockey Club	10	1	9	0	25	97	2
