= 1988–89 Japan Ice Hockey League season =

The 1988–89 Japan Ice Hockey League season was the 23rd season of the Japan Ice Hockey League. Six teams participated in the league, and Kokudo Keikaku won the championship.

== Regular season ==
	Team	GP	W	L	T	GF	GA	Pts
1.	Kokudo Keikaku	30	21	3	6	153	75	48
2.	Oji Seishi Hockey	30	18	5	7	166	91	43
3.	Seibu Tetsudo	30	13	9	8	116	99	34
4.	Sapporo Snow Brand	30	11	13	6	103	109	28
5.	Jujo Ice Hockey Club	30	8	18	3	86	136	19
6.	Furukawa Ice Hockey Club	30	2	24	4	64	178	8
