= Sergei Bautin =

Soviet ice hockey player (1967–2022)

- Born: 11 March 1967 Rahachow, Byelorussian SSR, Soviet Union
- Died: 31 December 2022 (aged 55)
- Height: 6 ft 3 in (191 cm)
- Weight: 200 lb (91 kg; 14 st 4 lb)
- Position: Defenceman
- Shot: Left
- Played for: HC Dynamo Moscow; Winnipeg Jets; Detroit Red Wings; San Jose Sharks; Luleå HF; Ak Bars Kazan; Nürnberg Ice Tigers; Oji Seishi Tomakomai; Metallurg Magnitogorsk
- National team: Unified Team and Russia
- NHL draft: 17th overall, 1992; Winnipeg Jets
- Playing career: 1990–2004
Medal record
Men's ice hockey
Representing Unified Team
| Gold medal – first place | 1992 Albertville | Team |

Sergei Viktorovich Bautin (Russian: Сергей Виҝторович Баутин; 11 March 1967 – 31 December 2022) was a Soviet-born ice hockey player who played in the National Hockey League (NHL) for the Winnipeg Jets, Detroit Red Wings and the San Jose Sharks.

== Playing career ==
Bautin was drafted in the first round, 17th overall, of the 1992 NHL entry draft by the Winnipeg Jets.

Bautin ended up playing 130 games for the Jets, scoring 5 goals and 25 assists for 30 points, collecting 176 penalty minutes. He wore the number 3, and was usually paired with fellow Russian Igor Ulanov.

On 8 March 1994, Bautin, along with Bob Essensa, was traded to the Detroit Red Wings for Tim Cheveldae and Dallas Drake. After his stint with Detroit, Sergei then signed on as a Free Agent with the San Jose Sharks in 1995. He played the rest of the 1995–96 season with San Jose's IHL affiliate, the Kansas City Blades.

In addition to his NHL experience, Bautin was a significant member of the 1992 Unified Team (former Soviet Union) where they won the gold medal by defeating Canada, 3–1.

Bautin continued his career playing for pro teams in Sweden, Germany and Japan before finishing his career in Russia.

After his retirement, he returned to Kansas City, where he worked as the head coach of the Kansas City Outlaws Bantam AA Hockey team. He also ran various hockey camps throughout the summer. He was also involved with Team Kansas, a player development program with an emphasis on team play and chemistry.

In 2010, Bautin started coaching for Colorado Evolution in Stapleton, Colorado. He coached all levels at the B, A, AA, and AAA. Latterly, Bautin coached the Colorado Evolution U15 AAA to 2017 National Runner-Up after losing to the Yale Jr. Bulldogs 7–2. He left Colorado Evolution in Spring of 2018. He was also the head coach of Colorado Thunderbirds 2007 team.

Bautin died on 31 December 2022, at the age of 55.

== Career statistics ==
=== Regular season and playoffs ===
| | | | Regular season | | | | | Playoffs |
| Season | Team | League | GP | G | A | Pts | PIM | GP | G | A | Pts | PIM |
|---|---|---|---|---|---|---|---|---|---|---|---|---|
| 1987–88 | Kristall Saratov | URS.2 | 68 | 0 | 4 | 4 | 94 | — | — | — | — | — |
| 1988–89 | Kristall Saratov | URS.2 | 67 | 11 | 10 | 21 | 104 | — | — | — | — | — |
| 1989–90 | Kristall Saratov | URS.2 | 62 | 5 | 5 | 10 | 70 | — | — | — | — | — |
| 1990–91 | Dynamo Moscow | URS | 33 | 2 | 0 | 2 | 28 | — | — | — | — | — |
| 1990–91 | Dynamo–2 Moscow | URS.3 | 3 | 1 | 0 | 1 | 4 | — | — | — | — | — |
| 1991–92 | Dynamo Moscow | CIS | 32 | 1 | 2 | 3 | 88 | 5 | 0 | 1 | 1 | 0 |
| 1991–92 | Dynamo–2 Moscow | CIS.3 | 2 | 0 | 0 | 0 | 22 | — | — | — | — | — |
| 1992–93 | Winnipeg Jets | NHL | 71 | 5 | 18 | 23 | 96 | 6 | 0 | 0 | 0 | 2 |
| 1993–94 | Winnipeg Jets | NHL | 59 | 0 | 7 | 7 | 78 | — | — | — | — | — |
| 1993–94 | Detroit Red Wings | NHL | 1 | 0 | 0 | 0 | 0 | — | — | — | — | — |
| 1993–94 | Adirondack Red Wings | AHL | 9 | 1 | 5 | 6 | 6 | — | — | — | — | — |
| 1994–95 | Adirondack Red Wings | AHL | 32 | 0 | 10 | 10 | 57 | 1 | 0 | 0 | 0 | 4 |
| 1995–96 | San Jose Sharks | NHL | 1 | 0 | 0 | 0 | 2 | — | — | — | — | — |
| 1995–96 | Kansas City Blades | IHL | 60 | 0 | 14 | 14 | 113 | 3 | 0 | 0 | 0 | 6 |
| 1996–97 | Luleå HF | SEL | 36 | 1 | 0 | 1 | 113 | 8 | 1 | 2 | 3 | 31 |
| 1997–98 | Luleå HF | SEL | 43 | 3 | 5 | 8 | 52 | 2 | 0 | 0 | 0 | 4 |
| 1998–99 | Ak Bars Kazan | RSL | 41 | 0 | 5 | 5 | 76 | 13 | 0 | 3 | 3 | 18 |
| 1999–2000 | Nürnberg Ice Tigers | DEL | 50 | 4 | 7 | 11 | 105 | — | — | — | — | — |
| 2000–01 | Oji Seishi Hockey | JPN | 40 | 5 | 19 | 24 | — | 5 | 2 | 4 | 6 | 8 |
| 2001–02 | Oji Seishi Hockey | JPN | 37 | 1 | 12 | 13 | — | 2 | 1 | 0 | 1 | — |
| 2002–03 | Metallurg Magnitogorsk | RSL | 24 | 0 | 3 | 3 | 40 | — | — | — | — | — |
| 2003–04 | Krylya Sovetov Moscow | RUS.2 | 42 | 1 | 5 | 6 | 22 | 4 | 1 | 0 | 1 | 0 |
| URS/CIS totals | | | 65 | 3 | 2 | 5 | 116 | 5 | 0 | 1 | 1 | 0 |
| NHL totals | | | 132 | 5 | 25 | 30 | 176 | 6 | 0 | 0 | 0 | 2 |
| RSL totals | | | 66 | 0 | 8 | 8 | 116 | 13 | 0 | 3 | 3 | 18 |

=== International ===
| Year | Team | Event | Place | GP | G | A | Pts | PIM |
|---|---|---|---|---|---|---|---|---|
| 1992 | Unified Team | OG | 1st place, gold medalist(s) | 8 | 0 | 0 | 0 | 6 |
| 1992 | Russia | WC | 5th | 6 | 1 | 1 | 2 | 8 |
| 1997 | Russia | WC | 4th | 9 | 0 | 2 | 2 | 14 |
| 1999 | Russia | WC | 5th | 4 | 0 | 2 | 2 | 8 |
| Senior totals | | | | 27 | 1 | 5 | 6 | 36 |

| Preceded by Aaron Ward | Winnipeg Jets first-round draft pick 1992 | Succeeded by Mats Lindgren |
