= 1971–72 Japan Ice Hockey League season =

The 1971–72 Japan Ice Hockey League season was the sixth season of the Japan Ice Hockey League. Five teams participated in the league, and the Seibu Tetsudo won the championship.

== Regular season ==
	Team	GP	W	L	T	GF	GA	Pts
1.	Seibu Tetsudo	8	8	0	0	76	14	16
2.	Oji Seishi Hockey	8	6	2	0	56	25	12
3.	Iwakura Ice Hockey Club	8	4	4	0	39	36	8
4.	Furukawa Ice Hockey Club	8	2	6	0	24	69	4
5.	Fukutoku Ice Hockey Club	8	0	8	0	15	66	0
