= 1967–68 Japan Ice Hockey League season =

The 1967–68 Japan Ice Hockey League season was the second season of the Japan Ice Hockey League. Five teams participated in the league, and Iwakura Ice Hockey Club won the championship.

== Regular season ==
	Team	GP	W	L	T	GF	GA	Pts
1.	Iwakura Ice Hockey Club	8	7	0	1	62	14	15
2.	Oji Seishi Hockey	8	5	2	1	55	17	10
3.	Seibu Tetsudo	8	4	4	2	54	35	10
4.	Fukutoku Ice Hockey Club	8	1	6	0	21	54	2
5.	Furukawa Ice Hockey Club	8	1	6	0	14	86	2
