= 1984–85 Japan Ice Hockey League season =

The 1984–85 Japan Ice Hockey League season was the 19th season of the Japan Ice Hockey League. Six teams participated in the league, and the Oji Seishi Hockey won the championship.

== Regular season ==
	Team	GP	W	L	T	GF	GA	Pts
1.	Oji Seishi Hockey	30	24	3	3	187	82	51
2.	Sapporo Snow Brand	30	16	8	6	124	91	38
3.	Seibu Tetsudo	30	12	12	6	115	120	30
4.	Kokudo Keikaku	30	13	13	4	130	113	30
5.	Jujo Ice Hockey Club	30	7	20	3	88	165	17
6.	Furukawa Ice Hockey Club	30	6	22	2	85	158	14
