= 1975–76 Japan Ice Hockey League season =

The 1975–76 Japan Ice Hockey League season was the tenth season of the Japan Ice Hockey League. Six teams participated in the league, and the Seibu Tetsudo won the championship.

== Regular season ==
	Team	GP	W	L	T	GF	GA	Pts
1.	Seibu Tetsudo	15	13	2	0	99	27	26
2.	Oji Seishi Hockey	15	12	3	0	108	35	24
3.	Kokudo Keikaku	15	10	4	1	85	43	21
4.	Iwakura Ice Hockey Club	15	4	9	2	66	78	10
5.	Jujo Ice Hockey Club	15	3	12	0	34	106	6
6.	Furukawa Ice Hockey Club	15	1	13	1	30	133	3
