= 1973–74 Japan Ice Hockey League season =

The 1973–74 Japan Ice Hockey League season was the eighth season of the Japan Ice Hockey League. Five teams participated in the league, and the Oji Seishi Hockey won the championship.

== Regular season ==
	Team	GP	W	L	T	GF	GA	Pts
1.	Oji Seishi Hockey	12	10	2	0	87	42	20
2.	Kokudo Keikaku	12	7	3	2	71	48	16
3.	Seibu Tetsudo	12	5	4	3	55	43	13
4.	Iwakura Ice Hockey Club	12	4	7	1	51	49	9
5.	Furukawa Ice Hockey Club	12	1	11	0	33	115	2
