= 1987–88 Japan Ice Hockey League season =

The 1987–88 Japan Ice Hockey League season was the 22nd season of the Japan Ice Hockey League. Six teams participated in the league, and the Oji Seishi Hockey won the championship.

== Regular season ==
	Team	GP	W	L	T	GF	GA	Pts
1.	Oji Seishi Hockey	30	21	6	3	135	83	45
2.	Kokudo Keikaku	30	20	6	4	134	79	44
3.	Sapporo Snow Brand	30	16	9	5	108	82	37
4.	Seibu Tetsudo	30	12	15	3	92	108	27
5.	Jujo Ice Hockey Club	30	6	21	3	77	127	15
6.	Furukawa Ice Hockey Club	30	5	23	2	76	143	12
