= 1986–87 Japan Ice Hockey League season =

The 1986–87 Japan Ice Hockey League season was the 21st season of the Japan Ice Hockey League. Six teams participated in the league, and the Oji Seishi Hockey won the championship.

== Regular season ==
	Team	GP	W	L	T	GF	GA	Pts
1.	Oji Seishi Hockey	30	23	3	4	158	66	50
2.	Kokudo Keikaku	30	20	6	4	131	81	44
3.	Seibu Tetsudo	30	13	12	5	108	105	31
4.	Sapporo Snow Brand	30	11	13	6	94	98	28
5.	Furukawa Ice Hockey Club	30	4	20	6	68	131	14
6.	Jujo Ice Hockey Club	30	4	21	5	68	146	13
