= 1966–67 Japan Ice Hockey League season =

Japan ice hockey league (1966 - 1967)

The 1966–67 Japan Ice Hockey League season was the first season of the Japan Ice Hockey League. Five teams participated in the league, and Iwakura Ice Hockey Club won the championship.

== Regular season ==
	Team	GP	W	L	T	GF	GA	Pts
1.	Iwakura Ice Hockey Club	8	7	1	0	38	18	14
2.	Oji Seishi Hockey	8	6	2	0	39	21	12
3.	Fukutoku Ice Hockey Club	8	4	3	1	30	30	9
4.	Seibu Tetsudo	8	1	6	1	20	36	3
5.	Furukawa Ice Hockey Club	8	1	7	0	21	43	2
