= 1983–84 Japan Ice Hockey League season =

The 1983–84 Japan Ice Hockey League season was the 18th season of the Japan Ice Hockey League. Six teams participated in the league, and the Oji Seishi Hockey won the championship.

== Regular season ==
	Team	GP	W	L	T	GF	GA	Pts
1.	Oji Seishi Hockey	30	25	4	1	176	101	51
2.	Kokudo Keikaku	30	16	10	4	136	116	36
3.	Seibu Tetsudo	30	16	11	3	131	109	35
4.	Sapporo Snow Brand	30	13	13	4	115	110	30
5.	Jujo Ice Hockey Club	30	7	20	3	108	146	17
6.	Furukawa Ice Hockey Club	30	5	24	1	82	165	11
