= 1978–79 Japan Ice Hockey League season =

The 1978–79 Japan Ice Hockey League season was the 13th season of the Japan Ice Hockey League. Six teams participated in the league, and the Seibu Tetsudo won the championship.

== Regular season ==
	Team	GP	W	L	T	GF	GA	Pts
1.	Seibu Tetsudo	20	14	3	3	88	43	31
2.	Kokudo Keikaku	20	13	4	3	80	54	29
3.	Iwakura Ice Hockey Club	20	13	7	0	94	71	26
4.	Oji Seishi Hockey	20	10	7	3	101	66	23
5.	Furukawa Ice Hockey Club	20	2	16	2	42	102	6
6.	Jujo Ice Hockey Club	20	2	17	1	46	115	5
