= Len Esau =

Canadian ice hockey player (born 1968)

- Born: March 16, 1968 (age 58) Meadow Lake, Saskatchewan, Canada
- Height: 6 ft 3 in (191 cm)
- Weight: 195 lb (88 kg; 13 st 13 lb)
- Position: Defence
- Shot: Right
- Played for: Toronto Maple Leafs; Quebec Nordiques; Calgary Flames; Edmonton Oilers
- National team: Canada
- NHL draft: 86th overall, 1988; Toronto Maple Leafs
- Playing career: 1990–2001

Len Esau
Medal record

Men's ice hockey

Representing Canada

World Championships
Bronze medal – third place	1995 Sweden	Ice hockey

Leonard Esau (born March 16, 1968) is a Canadian former ice hockey defenceman who played 27 games in the National Hockey League for the Toronto Maple Leafs, Quebec Nordiques, Calgary Flames and the Edmonton Oilers between 1991 and 1995. The Leafs drafted him in the fifth round 86th overall in the 1988 NHL entry draft from the St. Cloud State Huskies. Esau never scored a goal in the NHL, but notched up 10 assists and collected 24 penalty minutes. He spent much of his tenure in the American Hockey League and the International Hockey League, but also spent one season in Japan, playing for Seibu-Tetsudo Tokyo. Internationally Esau played for the Canadian national team at the 1995 World Championships, winning a bronze medal.

== Career statistics ==
=== Regular season and playoffs ===
			Regular season					Playoffs
Season	Team	League	GP	G	A	Pts	PIM	GP	G	A	Pts	PIM
1985–86	Humboldt Broncos	SJHL	2	0	0	0	21	2	1	1	2	4
1986–87	Humboldt Broncos	SJHL	57	4	26	30	278	—	—	—	—	—
1987–88	Humboldt Broncos	SJHL	57	16	37	53	229	—	—	—	—	—
1988–89	St. Cloud State	NCAA	35	12	27	39	69	—	—	—	—	—
1989–90	St. Cloud State	NCAA	29	8	11	19	83	—	—	—	—	—
1990–91	Newmarket Saints	AHL	76	4	14	18	28	—	—	—	—	—
1991–92	St. John's Maple Leafs	AHL	78	9	29	38	68	13	0	2	2	14
1991–92	Toronto Maple Leafs	NHL	2	0	0	0	0	—	—	—	—	—
1992–93	Halifax Citadels	AHL	75	11	31	42	79	—	—	—	—	—
1992–93	Quebec Nordiques	NHL	4	0	1	1	2	—	—	—	—	—
1993–94	Saint John Flames	AHL	75	12	36	48	129	7	2	2	4	6
1993–94	Calgary Flames	NHL	6	0	3	3	7	—	—	—	—	—
1994–95	Saint John Flames	AHL	54	13	27	40	73	5	0	2	2	0
1994–95	Edmonton Oilers	NHL	14	0	6	6	15	—	—	—	—	—
1994–95	Calgary Flames	NHL	1	0	0	0	0	—	—	—	—	—
1995–96	Cincinnati Cyclones	IHL	82	15	21	36	150	17	5	6	11	26
1996–97	Milwaukee Admirals	IHL	49	6	16	22	70	—	—	—	—	—
1996–97	Detroit Vipers	IHL	30	6	8	14	36	13	1	4	5	38
1997–98	Milwaukee Admirals	IHL	26	3	9	12	32	—	—	—	—	—
1997–98	Indianapolis Ice	IHL	55	6	33	39	28	5	0	0	0	4
1998–99	Seibu–Tetsudo	JIHL	21	6	11	17	0	3	0	1	1	0
1999–00	Cincinnati Cyclones	IHL	78	8	17	25	64	10	0	2	2	14
2000–01	Cincinnati Cyclones	IHL	68	3	16	19	61	5	1	1	2	8
AHL totals			358	49	137	186	377	25	2	6	8	20
IHL totals			388	47	120	167	441	50	7	13	20	90
NHL totals			27	0	10	10	24	—	—	—	—	—

=== International ===
Year	Team	Event	GP	G	A	Pts	PIM
1995	Canada	WC	7	0	1	1	2
Senior totals			7	0	1	1	2
