= 1980–81 Japan Ice Hockey League season =

Japan's 1980-81 Ice Hockey League season

The 1980–81 Japan Ice Hockey League season was the 15th season of the Japan Ice Hockey League. Six teams participated in the league, and the Seibu Tetsudo won the championship.

== Regular season ==
| | Team | GP | W | L | T | GF | GA | Pts |
|---|---|---|---|---|---|---|---|---|
| 1. | Seibu Tetsudo | 20 | 16 | 2 | 2 | 89 | 43 | 34 |
| 2. | Oji Seishi Hockey | 20 | 16 | 3 | 1 | 111 | 51 | 33 |
| 3. | Kokudo Keikaku | 20 | 12 | 6 | 2 | 109 | 60 | 26 |
| 4. | Jujo Ice Hockey Club | 20 | 7 | 13 | 0 | 68 | 100 | 14 |
| 5. | Sapporo Snow Brand | 20 | 3 | 16 | 1 | 46 | 125 | 7 |
| 6. | Furukawa Ice Hockey Club | 20 | 3 | 17 | 0 | 48 | 92 | 6 |
