= 1970–71 Japan Ice Hockey League season =

The 1970–71 Japan Ice Hockey League season was the fifth season of the Japan Ice Hockey League. Five teams participated in the league, and the Seibu Tetsudo won the championship.

== Regular season ==
	Team	GP	W	L	T	GF	GA	Pts
1.	Seibu Tetsudo	12	11	1	0	109	21	22
2.	Oji Seishi Hockey	12	9	3	0	55	20	18
3.	Iwakura Ice Hockey Club	12	7	5	0	53	44	14
4.	Furukawa Ice Hockey Club	12	2	10	0	25	104	4
5.	Fukutoku Ice Hockey Club	12	1	11	0	17	70	2
