= 1990–91 Japan Ice Hockey League season =

The 1990–91 Japan Ice Hockey League season was the 25th season of the Japan Ice Hockey League. Six teams participated in the league, and the Oji Seishi Hockey won the championship.

== Regular season ==
	Team	GP	W	L	T	GF	GA	Pts
1.	Kokudo Keikaku	30	22	8	0	156	77	44
2.	Oji Seishi Hockey	30	20	8	2	145	87	42
3.	Jujo Ice Hockey Club	30	16	13	1	106	102	33
4.	Sapporo Snow Brand	30	14	14	2	103	99	30
5.	Seibu Tetsudo	30	12	16	2	83	103	26
6.	Furukawa Ice Hockey Club	30	2	27	1	51	176	5

== Final ==
- Oji Seishi Hockey - Kokudo Keikaku 3:2 (4:2, 4:5, 2:4, 2:1 n.V., 4:3)
