= Pavel Šrek =

Czech ice hockey defenceman

- Born: December 17, 1967 (age 57)
- Height: 6 ft 2 in (188 cm)
- Weight: 205 lb (93 kg; 14 st 9 lb)
- Position: Defence
- Shot: Left
- Played for: HC Sparta Praha; Sapporo Snow Brand; HC Plzeň
- Playing career: 1987–2009

Pavel Šrek (born December 17, 1967) is a Czech former professional ice hockey defenceman. He is currently working as the Director of Player Development for HC Sparta Praha.

Šrek played in the Czechoslovak First Ice Hockey League and the Czech Extraliga with HC Sparta Praha and HC Plzeň. He played a total of 557 games for Sparta Praha in twelve seasons and won a league championship with the team in 2002. He also played one season in the Japan Ice Hockey League for Sapporo Snow Brand during the 1996–97 season.

On May 15, 2020, it was announced by Sparta Praha that Šrek would move into a new role with the team as their Director of Player Development.
