= Tom Pederson =

American ice hockey player (born 1970)

- Born: January 14, 1970 (age 56) Bloomington, Minnesota, U.S.
- Height: 5 ft 9 in (175 cm)
- Weight: 175 lb (79 kg; 12 st 7 lb)
- Position: Defense
- Shot: Right
- Played for: San Jose Sharks; Toronto Maple Leafs
- National team: United States
- NHL draft: 217th overall, 1989; Minnesota North Stars
- Playing career: 1991–2000

Thomas Stuart Pederson (born January 14, 1970) is an American former professional ice hockey defenseman who played five seasons in the National Hockey League between 1992–93 and 1996–97.

== Career ==
Pederson was drafted 217th overall by the Minnesota North Stars in the 1989 NHL entry draft. He played 240 career NHL games with the San Jose Sharks and Toronto Maple Leafs, scoring 20 goals and 49 assists for 69 points.

Pederson played one season in Japan for Seibu Tetsudo Tokyo between playing for the Sharks and the Maple Leafs. He retired in 2000 after playing two season for the Hannover Scorpions in Germany's Deutsche Eishockey Liga.

He later created the Green Biscuit, an off-ice stick handling and passing aid which stays flat on nearly any surface.

== Career statistics ==
			Regular season					Playoffs
Season	Team	League	GP	G	A	Pts	PIM	GP	G	A	Pts	PIM
1988–89	University of Minnesota	NCAA	42	5	24	29	46	—	—	—	—	—
1989–90	University of Minnesota	NCAA	43	8	30	38	58	—	—	—	—	—
1990–91	University of Minnesota	NCAA	36	12	20	32	46	—	—	—	—	—
1991–92	Kansas City Blades	IHL	20	6	9	15	16	13	1	6	7	14
1992–93	San Jose Sharks	NHL	44	7	13	20	31	—	—	—	—	—
1992–93	Kansas City Blades	IHL	26	6	15	21	10	12	1	6	7	2
1993–94	San Jose Sharks	NHL	74	6	19	25	31	14	1	6	7	2
1993–94	Kansas City Blades	IHL	7	3	1	4	0	—	—	—	—	—
1994–95	San Jose Sharks	NHL	47	5	11	16	31	10	0	5	5	8
1995–96	San Jose Sharks	NHL	60	1	4	5	40	—	—	—	—	—
1996–97	Seibu Tetsuyo Tokyo	JIHL	29	10	28	38	24	—	—	—	—	—
1996–97	St. John's Maple Leafs	AHL	1	0	4	4	2	—	—	—	—	—
1996–97	Toronto Maple Leafs	NHL	15	1	2	3	9	—	—	—	—	—
1996–97	Utah Grizzlies	IHL	10	1	2	3	8	7	1	3	4	4
1997–98	Fort Wayne Komets	IHL	78	12	24	36	87	4	2	0	2	4
1998–99	Hannover Scorpions	DEL	50	10	22	32	53	—	—	—	—	—
1999–00	Hannover Scorpions	DEL	21	3	5	8	12	—	—	—	—	—
NHL totals			240	20	49	69	142	24	1	11	12	10
