= 1979–80 Japan Ice Hockey League season =

Ice hockey league season in Japan (1979–80)

The 1979–80 Japan Ice Hockey League season was the 14th season of the Japan Ice Hockey League. Six teams participated in the league, and the Oji Seishi Hockey won the championship.

== Regular season ==
	Team	GP	W	L	T	GF	GA	Pts
1.	Oji Seishi Hockey	15	10	1	4	114	41	24
2.	Seibu Tetsudo	15	9	2	4	74	33	22
3.	Kokudo Keikaku	15	9	2	4	73	43	22
4.	Jujo Ice Hockey Club	15	6	6	3	55	66	15
5.	Furukawa Ice Hockey Club	15	2	12	1	21	101	5
6.	Sapporo Snow Brand	15	1	14	0	41	94	2
