= 1976–77 Japan Ice Hockey League season =

The 1976–77 Japan Ice Hockey League season was the eleventh season of the Japan Ice Hockey League. Six teams participated in the league, and the Seibu Tetsudo won the championship.

== Regular season ==
	Team	GP	W	L	T	GF	GA	Pts
1.	Seibu Tetsudo	15	13	1	1	103	22	27
2.	Oji Seishi Hockey	15	12	2	1	117	33	25
3.	Kokudo Keikaku	15	8	5	2	60	50	18
4.	Iwakura Ice Hockey Club	15	5	10	0	48	88	10
5.	Furukawa Ice Hockey Club	15	3	12	0	39	106	6
6.	Jujo Ice Hockey Club	15	2	13	0	40	105	4
