= 1989–90 Japan Ice Hockey League season =

The 1989–90 Japan Ice Hockey League season was the 24th season of the Japan Ice Hockey League. Six teams participated in the league, and the Oji Seishi Hockey won the championship.

== Regular season ==
	Team	GP	W	L	T	GF	GA	Pts
1.	Oji Seishi Hockey	30	26	1	3	162	59	55
2.	Kokudo Keikaku	30	22	3	5	152	79	49
3.	Jujo Ice Hockey Club	30	12	13	5	93	105	29
4.	Sapporo Snow Brand	30	8	17	5	84	116	21
5.	Seibu Tetsudo	30	6	19	5	79	123	17
6.	Furukawa Ice Hockey Club	30	2	23	5	47	135	9
