= 1982–83 Japan Ice Hockey League season =

Sports season

The 1982–83 Japan Ice Hockey League season was the 17th season of the Japan Ice Hockey League. Six teams participated in the league, and the Oji Eagles won the championship.

== Regular season ==
	Team	GP	W	L	T	GF	GA	Pts
1.	Oji Seishi Hockey	30	26	3	1	221	103	53
2.	Seibu Tetsudo	30	16	9	5	137	103	37
3.	Sapporo Snow Brand	30	12	12	6	124	151	30
4.	Kokudo Keikaku	30	11	14	5	127	143	27
5.	Jujo Ice Hockey Club	30	6	18	6	113	169	18
6.	Furukawa Ice Hockey Club	30	6	21	3	107	160	15
