= 1994–95 Japan Ice Hockey League season =

The 1994–95 Japan Ice Hockey League season was the 29th season of the Japan Ice Hockey League. Six teams participated in the league, and Kokudo Ice Hockey Club won the championship.

== Regular season ==
| | Team | GP | W | L | T | GF | GA | Pts |
|---|---|---|---|---|---|---|---|---|
| 1. | Kokudo Ice Hockey Club | 30 | 22 | 7 | 1 | 127 | 73 | 45 |
| 2. | Seibu Tetsudo | 30 | 20 | 9 | 1 | 132 | 80 | 41 |
| 3. | Shin Oji Seishi | 30 | 20 | 8 | 2 | 139 | 89 | 42 |
| 4. | Nippon Paper Cranes | 30 | 14 | 15 | 1 | 103 | 109 | 29 |
| 5. | Sapporo Snow Brand | 30 | 10 | 18 | 2 | 71 | 118 | 22 |
| 6. | Furukawa Ice Hockey Club | 30 | 0 | 29 | 1 | 50 | 153 | 1 |

== Final ==
- Seibu Tetsudo - Kokudo Ice Hockey Club 2:3 (3:4, 2:3 SO, 2:1, 2:1 SO, 1:4)
