= 1981–82 Japan Ice Hockey League season =

The 1981–82 Japan Ice Hockey League season was the 16th season of the Japan Ice Hockey League. Six teams participated in the league, and the Oji Seishi Hockey won the championship.

== Regular season ==
	Team	GP	W	L	T	GF	GA	Pts
1.	Oji Seishi Hockey	30	27	0	3	208	98	57
2.	Seibu Tetsudo	30	18	9	3	125	80	39
3.	Kokudo Keikaku	30	13	12	5	111	124	31
4.	Sapporo Snow Brand	30	10	19	1	119	140	21
5.	Jujo Ice Hockey Club	30	8	18	4	134	169	20
6.	Furukawa Ice Hockey Club	30	5	23	2	78	164	12
