= 1977–78 Japan Ice Hockey League season =

The 1977–78 Japan Ice Hockey League season was the twelfth season of the Japan Ice Hockey League. Six teams participated in the league, and Kokudo Keikaku won the championship.

== Regular season ==
	Team	GP	W	L	T	GF	GA	Pts
1.	Kokudo Keikaku	15	12	2	1	84	29	25
2.	Oji Seishi Hockey	15	12	2	1	91	36	25
3.	Seibu Tetsudo	15	9	5	1	75	42	19
4.	Iwakura Ice Hockey Club	15	6	7	2	49	53	14
5.	Furukawa Ice Hockey Club	15	2	13	0	36	102	4
6.	Jujo Ice Hockey Club	15	1	13	1	28	101	3
