= 1969–70 Japan Ice Hockey League season =

The 1969–70 Japan Ice Hockey League season was the fourth season of the Japan Ice Hockey League. Five teams participated in the league, and the Oji Seishi Hockey won the championship.

== Regular season ==
	Team	GP	W	L	T	GF	GA	Pts
1.	Oji Seishi Hockey	8	7	1	0	62	13	14
2.	Seibu Tetsudo	8	6	2	0	63	26	12
3.	Iwakura Ice Hockey Club	8	4	4	0	45	37	8
4.	Furukawa Ice Hockey Club	8	2	6	0	22	63	4
5.	Fukutoku Ice Hockey Club	8	1	7	0	11	64	2
