= 1995–96 Japan Ice Hockey League season =

Japanese professional ice hockey season

The 1995–96 Japan Ice Hockey League season was the 30th season of the Japan Ice Hockey League. Six teams participated in the league, and the Seibu Tetsudo won the championship.

== Regular season ==
	Team	GP	W	L	T	GF	GA	Pts
1.	Seibu Tetsudo	40	30	9	1	183	124	61
2.	Shin Oji Seishi	40	25	13	2	185	131	52
3.	Kokudo Ice Hockey Club	40	28	7	5	185	112	61
4.	Furukawa Ice Hockey Club	40	14	25	1	123	183	27
5.	Nippon Paper Cranes	40	9	29	2	140	171	18
6.	Sapporo Snow Brand	40	7	30	3	111	206	17

== Final ==
- Seibu Tetsudo - Shin Oji Seishi 3:0 (4:2, 7:6, 5:2)
