= 2006–07 Asia League Ice Hockey season =

The 2006–07 Asia League Ice Hockey season was the fourth season of Asia League Ice Hockey. Eight teams participated in the league, and the Nippon Paper Cranes won the championship.

== Regular season ==
	Club	GP	W	OTW	L	OTL	L	GF–GA	Pts
1.	Nippon Paper Cranes	34	27	1	1	2	3	198–79	86
2.	Seibu Prince Rabbits	34	21	3	5	1	4	173–71	75
3.	Oji Eagles	34	20	0	4	1	9	151–80	65
4.	Kangwon Land	34	18	3	1	1	11	153–110	62
5.	Anyang Halla	34	16	0	2	1	15	146–117	51
6.	Nikkō Kōbe Ice Bucks	34	12	0	1	0	21	90–158	37
7.	Hosa	34	6	0	0	1	27	86–188	19
8.	Changchun Fuao	34	2	0	0	0	32	41–235	6

== Playoffs ==
Pre-Playoffs
4	Kangwon Land	3
5	Anyang Halla	0
3	Oji Eagles	1
6	Nikkō Kōbe Ice Bucks	3

Semifinals
1	Nippon Paper Cranes	3
4	Kangwon Land	0
2	Seibu Prince Rabbits	3
6	Nikkō Kōbe Ice Bucks	0

Final
1	Nippon Paper Cranes	3
2	Seibu Prince Rabbits	1
