= 1996–97 Japan Ice Hockey League season =

The 1996–97 Japan Ice Hockey League season was the 31st season of the Japan Ice Hockey League. Six teams participated in the league, and the Seibu Tetsudo won the championship.

== Regular season ==
	Team	GP	W	L	T	GF	GA	Pts
1.	Oji Seishi Hockey	30	22	4	4	152	92	48
2.	Seibu Tetsudo	30	16	9	5	128	102	37
3.	Kokudo Ice Hockey Club	30	18	12	0	105	72	36
4.	Sapporo Snow Brand	30	10	18	2	78	116	22
5.	Nippon Paper Cranes	30	8	19	3	83	125	19
6.	Furukawa Ice Hockey Club	30	8	20	2	71	110	18

== Playoffs ==
Semifinals
1	Oji Seishi Hockey	2
4	Sapporo Snow Brand	1
2	Seibu Tetsudo	2
3	Kokudo Ice Hockey Club	0

Final
1	Oji Seishi Hockey	0
2	Seibu Tetsudo	2
