= 2008–09 Asia League Ice Hockey season =

The 2008–09 Asia League Ice Hockey season was the sixth season of Asia League Ice Hockey. Seven teams participated in the league, and the Nippon Paper Cranes won the championship.

== Regular season ==
	Club	GP	W	OTW	SOW	SOL	OTL	L	GF–GA	Pts
1.	Anyang Halla	36	22	1	2	2	2	7	150–105	76
2.	Seibu Prince Rabbits	36	20	1	5	1	0	9	136–99	73
3.	Oji Eagles	36	21	1	2	2	0	10	141–77	71
4.	Nippon Paper Cranes	36	18	3	2	2	3	8	120–95	69
5.	High1	36	13	0	1	3	2	17	97–112	46
6.	China Sharks	36	5	1	1	3	1	25	60–129	23
7.	Nikkō Ice Bucks	36	4	2	1	1	1	27	74–161	20

== Playoffs ==
=== Pre-Playoffs ===
- (4) Nippon Paper Cranes – (5) High1 2–0 (5–2, 8–4)

Semifinals
2	Seibu Prince Rabbits	4
3	Oji Eagles	0
1	Anyang Halla	3
4	Nippon Paper Cranes	4

Final
2	Seibu Prince Rabbits	3
4	Nippon Paper Cranes	4
