= 2001–02 Japan Ice Hockey League season =

The 2001–02 Japan Ice Hockey League season was the 36th season of the Japan Ice Hockey League. Six teams participated in the league, and Kokudo Ice Hockey Club won the championship.

== Regular season ==
	Team	GP	W	OTW	SOW	SOL	OTL	L	GF	GA	Pts
1.	Nippon Paper Cranes	40	25	2	1	3	1	8	162	105	59.5
2.	Seibu Tetsudo	40	24	1	3	0	3	9	152	111	57.5
3.	Oji Seishi Hockey	40	20	2	0	1	2	15	132	127	47
4.	Kokudo Ice Hockey Club	40	17	4	0	0	2	17	135	133	44
5.	Sapporo Polaris	40	8	2	1	1	3	25	104	149	25.5
6.	Nikkō Ice Bucks	40	6	2	2	2	2	26	103	163	23

== Playoffs ==
Semifinals
1	Nippon Paper Cranes	0
4	Kokudo Ice Hockey Club	2
2	Seibu Tetsudo	2
3	Oji Seishi Hockey	0

Final
4	Kokudo Ice Hockey Club	3
2	Seibu Tetsudo	2
