= 2003–04 Japan Ice Hockey League season =

The 2003–04 Japan Ice Hockey League season was the 38th and final season of the Japan Ice Hockey League. Four teams participated in the league, and Kokudo Ice Hockey Club won the championship.

== Regular season ==
=== First round ===
	Team	GP	W	OTW	OTL	L	GF	GA	Pts
1.	Kokudo Ice Hockey Club	12	9	0	2	1	52	26	20
2.	Oji Seishi Hockey	12	8	1	1	2	38	23	18
3.	Nippon Paper Cranes	12	3	1	1	7	37	37	8.5
4.	Nikkō Ice Bucks	12	1	1	1	9	15	56	4.5

=== Second round ===
	Team	GP	W	OTW	OTL	L	GF	GA	Pts
1.	Kokudo Ice Hockey Club	12	9	0	2	1	51	29	20
2.	Oji Seishi Hockey	12	8	0	1	3	47	37	17
3.	Nippon Paper Cranes	12	6	1	1	4	56	51	14.5
4.	Nikkō Ice Bucks	12	0	0	0	12	19	56	0
