= 2007–08 Asia League Ice Hockey season =

The 2007–08 Asia League Ice Hockey season was the fifth season of Asia League Ice Hockey. Seven teams participated in the league, and the Oji Eagles won the championship.

== Regular season ==
	Club	GP	W	OTW	T	OTL	L	GF–GA	Pts
1.	Seibu Prince Rabbits	30	20	0	1	0	9	138–73	61
2.	High1	30	17	2	1	2	8	118–89	58
3.	Oji Eagles	30	17	1	2	2	8	112–74	57
4.	Nippon Paper Cranes	30	15	1	2	1	11	97–85	50
5.	Anyang Halla	30	13	1	2	1	13	93–92	44
6.	Nikkō Ice Bucks	30	8	2	2	0	18	60–109	30
7.	China Sharks	30	3	0	0	1	26	63–159	10

== Playoffs ==
Pre-Playoffs
3	Oji Eagles	3
6	Nikkō Ice Bucks	0
4	Nippon Paper Cranes	3
5	Anyang Halla	0

Semifinals
2	High1	0
3	Ōji Eagles	3
1	Seibu Prince Rabbits	1
4	Nippon Paper Cranes	3

Final
3	Oji Eagles	3
4	Nippon Paper Cranes	0
