= 2011–12 Asia League Ice Hockey season =

The 2011–12 Asia League Ice Hockey season was the ninth season of Asia League Ice Hockey, which consists of teams from China, Japan, and South Korea. Seven teams participated in the league and the Oji Eagles won the championship.

== Regular season ==
	Club	GP	W	OTW	SOW	SOL	OTL	L	Goals	Pts
1.	Oji Eagles	36	21	1	2	4	2	6	141–82	75
2.	Anyang Halla	36	20	1	3	3	1	8	154–107	72
3.	Nikkō Ice Bucks	36	18	0	4	0	1	13	158–103	63
4.	Nippon Paper Cranes	36	16	1	3	1	1	14	128–110	58
5.	High1	36	16	3	0	1	2	14	150–126	57
6.	Tohoku Free Blades	36	13	3	1	4	1	14	106–111	52
7.	China Dragon	36	0	0	0	0	1	35	53–251	1

== Playoffs ==
Semifinals
1	Oji Eagles	3
4	Nippon Paper Cranes	0
2	Anyang Halla	2
3	Nikkō Ice Bucks	3

Final
1	Oji Eagles	3
3	Nikkō Ice Bucks	1
