= 2002–03 Japan Ice Hockey League season =

The 2002–03 Japan Ice Hockey League season was the 37th season of the Japan Ice Hockey League. Five teams participated in the league, and Kokudo Ice Hockey Club won the championship.

== Regular season ==
	Team	GP	W	OTW	SOW	OTL	L	GF	GA	Pts
1.	Seibu Tetsudo	32	15	2	3	3	9	108	84	41,5
2.	Oji Seishi Hockey	32	16	1	2	2	11	131	100	39
3.	Nippon Paper Cranes	32	14	1	1	3	13	104	100	34,5
4.	Kokudo Ice Hockey Club	32	12	0	2	5	13	89	102	32
5.	Nikkō Ice Bucks	32	7	0	4	3	18	68	114	23

== Playoffs ==
=== First round ===
- Nippon Paper Cranes - Kokudo Ice Hockey Club 1:3/3:2

=== Second round ===
- Oji Seishi Hockey - Kokudo Ice Hockey Club 3:5/3:3

=== Final ===
- Seibu Tetsudo - Kokudo Ice Hockey Club 2:3 (2:4, 4:2, 2:3, 2:1, 0:4)
