= 2003–04 Asia League Ice Hockey season =

The 2003–04 Asia League Ice Hockey season was the first season of Asia League Ice Hockey. Five teams participated in the league, and the Nippon Paper Cranes won the championship.

== Standings ==
	Club	GP	W	OTW	T	OTL	L	GF–GA	Pts
1.	Nippon Paper Cranes	16	13	0	0	0	3	80–49	39
2.	Kokudo Ice Hockey Club	16	12	0	0	1	3	78–36	37
3.	Anyang Halla	16	5	1	0	0	10	45–86	17
4.	Oji Eagles	16	5	0	2	0	9	55–58	17
5.	Nikkō Ice Bucks	16	2	0	2	0	12	38–67	8
