= 2004–05 Asia League Ice Hockey season =

The 2004–05 Asia League Ice Hockey season was the second season of Asia League Ice Hockey. Eight teams participated in the league, and Kokudo Ice Hockey Club won the championship.

== Regular season ==
	Club	GP	W	OTW	T	OTL	L	GF–GA	Pts
1.	Nippon Paper Cranes	42	31	0	5	0	6	206–85	98
2.	Kokudo Ice Hockey Club	42	31	0	4	1	6	208–90	98
3.	Golden Amur	42	26	1	3	1	11	204–90	84
4.	Oji Eagles	42	24	2	2	1	13	181–124	79
5.	Anyang Halla	42	17	1	5	1	18	152–140	59
6.	Nikkō Ice Bucks	42	13	1	2	2	24	110–125	45
7.	Harbin Ice Hockey Team	42	7	2	1	0	32	91–225	26
8.	Qiqihar Ice Hockey Team	42	1	0	0	1	40	53–326	4

== Playoffs ==
Semifinals
1	Nippon Paper Cranes	3
4	Oji Eagles	1
2	Kokudo Ice Hockey Club	3
3	Golden Amur	0

Final
1	Nippon Paper Cranes	1
2	Kokudo Ice Hockey Club	3
