= 1997–98 Japan Ice Hockey League season =

The 1997–98 Japan Ice Hockey League season was the 32nd season of the Japan Ice Hockey League. Six teams participated in the league, and Kokudo Ice Hockey Club won the championship.

== Regular season ==
	Team	GP	W	L	T	GF	GA	Pts
1.	Kokudo Ice Hockey Club	40	24	12	4	149	119	52
2.	Oji Seishi Hockey	40	22	14	4	165	129	48
3.	Sapporo Snow Brand	40	19	15	6	125	124	44
4.	Seibu Tetsudo	40	18	19	3	160	151	39
5.	Furukawa Ice Hockey Club	40	16	23	1	110	139	33
6.	Nippon Paper Cranes	40	11	27	2	120	167	24

== Playoffs ==
Semifinals
1	Kokudo Ice Hockey Club	2
4	Seibu Tetsudo	1
2	Oji Seishi Hockey	0
3	Sapporo Snow Brand	2

Final
1	Kokudo Ice Hockey Club	2
3	Sapporo Snow Brand	0
