= 2000–01 Japan Ice Hockey League season =

The 2000–01 Japan Ice Hockey League season was the 35th season of the Japan Ice Hockey League. Six teams participated in the league, and Kokudo Ice Hockey Club won the championship.

== Regular season ==
	Team	GP	W	L	T	GF	GA	Pts
1.	Kokudo Ice Hockey Club	40	25	13	2	152	118	52
2.	Oji Seishi Hockey	40	21	16	3	148	132	45
3.	Sapporo Snow Brand	40	21	17	2	122	114	44
4.	Nippon Paper Cranes	40	20	17	3	126	115	43
5.	Seibu Tetsudo	40	17	22	1	130	126	35
6.	Nikkō Ice Bucks	40	10	29	1	91	165	21

== Playoffs ==
Semifinals
1	Kokudo Ice Hockey Club	3
4	Nippon Paper Cranes	0
2	Oji Seishi Hockey	2
3	Sapporo Snow Brand	3

Final
1	Kokudo Ice Hockey Club	3
3	Sapporo Snow Brand	0
