= 1999–2000 Japan Ice Hockey League season =

The 1999–2000 Japan Ice Hockey League season was the 34th season of the Japan Ice Hockey League. Six teams participated in the league, and the Seibu Tetsudo won the championship.

== Regular season ==
	Team	GP	W	L	T	GF	GA	Pts
1.	Kokudo Ice Hockey Club	30	22	5	3	130	75	47
2.	Seibu Tetsudo	30	20	9	1	104	79	41
3.	Nippon Paper Cranes	30	14	13	3	94	88	31
4.	Oji Seishi Hockey	30	13	15	2	103	97	28
5.	Sapporo Snow Brand	30	9	17	4	79	110	22
6.	Nikkō Ice Bucks	30	3	22	5	45	106	11

== Playoffs ==
Semifinals
1	Kokudo Ice Hockey Club	3
4	Oji Seishi Hockey	0
2	Seibu Tetsudo	3
3	Nippon Paper Cranes	2

Final
1	Kokudo Ice Hockey Club	1
2	Seibu Tetsudo	3
