= 1998–99 Japan Ice Hockey League season =

The 1998–99 Japan Ice Hockey League season was the 33rd season of the Japan Ice Hockey League. Six teams participated in the league, and Kokudo Ice Hockey Club won the championship.

== Regular season ==
	Team	GP	W	L	T	GF	GA	Pts
1.	Kokudo Ice Hockey Club	40	31	8	1	182	93	63
2.	Oji Seishi Hockey	40	21	18	1	147	142	43
3.	Seibu Tetsudo	40	26	12	2	165	122	54
4.	Nippon Paper Cranes	40	18	18	4	138	147	40
5.	Sapporo Snow Brand	40	11	26	3	120	162	25
6.	Furukawa Ice Hockey Club	40	6	31	3	100	186	15

== Playoffs ==
Semifinals
1	Kokudo Ice Hockey Club	3
4	Nippon Paper Cranes	2
2	Oji Seishi Hockey	3
3	Seibu Tetsudo	0

Final
1	Kokudo Ice Hockey Club	3
2	Oji Seishi Hockey	1
