= Nippon Paper Cranes =

- City: Kushiro, Hokkaidō
- Founded: 1949
- Operated: 1949–2019
- Folded: 2019
- Home arena: Kushiro Ice Arena
- Colours: Black, red, white
- Owner: Nippon Paper Group

The Nippon Paper Cranes (日本製紙クレインズ, Nippon Seishi Kureinzu) were an Asia League Ice Hockey team based in Kushiro City in Hokkaidō, Japan.

== History ==
The club was founded as Jūjō Paper Kushiro Ice Hockey Club in 1949. They adopted the new name Nippon Paper Cranes in 1993 when Jūjō Paper and Sanyō Kokusaku Pulp merged to form Nippon Paper.

They won the inaugural Asia League Ice Hockey title in the 2003–04 season, and have won it four times overall. They have also won the All Japan Ice hockey Championship seven times. After the 2018–19 season, the team was dissolved due to financial difficulties, and was replaced by the East Hokkaido Cranes.

== Honours ==
- Asia League:
  - Winners (4): 2003–04, 2006–07, 2008–09, 2013–14
- All Japan Championship:
  - Winners (7): 2006, 2007, 2010, 2011, 2012, 2013, 2015

== Season-by-season record ==
=== Asia League ===
Season	GP	W	W(OT)	W(GWS)*	T	L(GWS)*	L(OT)	L	GF	GA	PTS	Finish	Playoffs
2003–04	16	13	0	—	0	—	0	3	80	49	39	1st/5	Won League
2004–05	42	31	0	—	5	—	0	6	206	85	98	1st/8	Lost in finals
2005–06	38	30	2	—	1	—	0	5	240	66	95	1st/9	Lost in finals
2006–07	34	27	1	—	1	—	2	3	198	79	86	1st/8	Won championship
2007–08	30	15	1	—	2	—	1	11	97	85	50	4th/7	Lost in finals
2008–09	36	18	3	2	—	2	3	8	120	95	69	4th/7	Won championship
2009–10	36	18	3	3	—	2	0	10	128	101	68	3rd/7	Lost in finals
2010–11	36	21	2	1	—	3	2	7	141	95	74	2nd/7	Lost in semi-finals
2011–12	36	16	1	3	—	1	1	14	128	110	58	4th/7	Lost in semi-finals
2012–13	42	17	4	6	—	3	3	9	176	130	77	3rd/7	Lost in semi-finals
Totals	346	205	17	15	9	12	11	76	1514	895	—	—	3 Championships

*prior to the 2008–2009 season, there were no shoot-outs and games ended in a tie

== Past import players ==
- (Russia) Georgy Yevtyukhin, 1996–97 C
- (Canada) Joel Dyck 2003–2009, D
- (Canada) Chris Lindberg 2004–05, LW
- (United States) Derek Plante 2005–07, D
- (Canada) Jamie McLennan 2007–08, G
- (Canada) Tyson Nash 2007–08, LW
- (United States) Kelly Fairchild 2008–09, C
- (Canada) Brad Tiley 2008–09, D
- (Canada) Pierre-Olivier Beaulieu 2009–10, D
- (Canada) Ash Goldie 2010–11, FW
- (Canada) Mike Madill 2010–11, D
- (United States) Ray DiLauro 2011, D
- (Canada) Tyler Mosienko 2011–12, C
- (Canada) John Hecimovic 2011–12, RW
