= Japan Ice Hockey League =

League in Japan

- Sport: Ice hockey
- Founded: 1966
- Folded: 2004
- No. of teams: Maximum of six
- Country: Japan
- Last champions: Kokudo Tokyo, 2004

The Japan Ice Hockey League (JIHL) (日本アイスホッケーリーグ) was an annual ice hockey league that began in 1966 and ended in 2004 when it was replaced by Asia League Ice Hockey. Only Japanese teams competed in the JIHL.

Baseball and football have been the dominant Japanese sports for decades, but ice hockey in Japan started in the 1920s.

Teams have been competing in the All Japan Championships since 1930, making the tournament one of the oldest sporting competitions in the country.

Professional hockey arrived in 1966 with the Japan Ice Hockey League. Originally a five-team league, the JIHL expanded to six teams in 1974 and stayed that way until tough economic times led to budget cutbacks and eventually the demise of the league in 2004.

Organizers decided the sport could only prosper in Asia if teams in Japan, China and South Korea formed a multinational league, and in 2004 the 38-year-old JIHL was abandoned in favor of Asia League Ice Hockey.

== Japan Ice Hockey League champions ==
Season	Winner
1966–67	Iwakura Tomakomai
1967–68	Iwakura Tomakomai
1968–69	Oji Seishi Tomakomai
1969–70	Oji Seishi Tomakomai
1970–71	Seibu Tetsudo Tokyo
1971–72	Seibu Tetsudo Tokyo
1972–73	Seibu Tetsudo Tokyo
1973–74	Oji Seishi Tomakomai
1974–75	Kokudo Keikaku Tokyo
1975–76	Seibu Tetsudo Tokyo
1976–77	Seibu Tetsudo Tokyo
1977–78	Kokudo Keikaku Tokyo
1978–79	Seibu Tetsudo Tokyo
1979–80	Oji Seishi Tomakomai
1980–81	Seibu Tetsudo Tokyo
1981–82	Oji Seishi Tomakomai
1982–83	Oji Seishi Tomakomai
1983–84	Oji Seishi Tomakomai
1984–85	Oji Seishi Tomakomai
1985–86	Kokudo Keikaku Tokyo
1986–87	Oji Seishi Tomakomai
1987–88	Oji Seishi Tomakomai
1988–89	Kokudo Keikaku Tokyo
1989–90	Oji Seishi Tomakomai
1990–91	Oji Seishi Tomakomai
1991–92	Kokudo Keikaku Tokyo
1992–93	Kokudo Tokyo
1993–94	Shin Oji Tomakomai
1994–95	Kokudo Tokyo
1995–96	Seibu Tetsudo Tokyo
1996–97	Seibu Tetsudo Tokyo
1997–98	Kokudo Tokyo
1998–99	Kokudo Tokyo
1999–00	Seibu Tetsudo Tokyo
2000–01	Kokudo Tokyo
2001–02	Kokudo Tokyo
2002–03	Kokudo Tokyo
2003–04	Kokudo Tokyo

== Fictional player ==
Fictional ice hockey player Taro Tsujimoto was said to have come from the "Tokyo Katanas" of the JIHL; neither the player nor the team existed, but were instead the creation of Punch Imlach. Imlach, as general manager of the Buffalo Sabres, legally drafted Tsujimoto with the 183rd pick in the 1974 NHL entry draft, in protest of the league's secrecy policies. When Imlach revealed Tsujimoto was not a real person, the pick was subsequently invalidated.

== See also ==
- Asia League Ice Hockey
- All Japan Ice hockey Championship
