= Red Eagles Hokkaido =

- City: Tomakomai, Hokkaidō
- League: Asia League Ice Hockey
- Founded: 1925 (as Oji Eagles)
- Home arena: Hakucho Arena
- Colours
- Owner: Oji Paper Company
- Head coach: Nobuhiro Sugawara
- Captain: Shogo Nakajima
- Website: redeagles.co.jp

The Red Eagles Hokkaido (レッドイーグルス北海道) are a professional ice hockey team based in Tomakomai city on Hokkaidō, Japan. They are members of the Asia League Ice Hockey.

== History ==
The club was founded as the Oji Eagles in 1925. They have won the Japan League 13 times, the All Japan Championship 37 times and the Asia League 3 times. Oji became a founding member of Asia League Ice Hockey in 2003. In 2021 the team changed its name to the Red Eagles Hokkaido.

== Honours ==
- Asia League:
  - Winners (2): 2007–08, 2011–12
- Japan League:
  - Winners (13): 1968–69, 1969–70, 1973–74, 1979–80, 1981–82, 1982–83, 1983–84, 1984–85, 1986–87, 1987–88, 1989–90, 1990–91, 1993–94
- All Japan Championship:
  - Winners (37): 1932, 1935, 1947, 1950, 1951, 1952, 1954, 1955, 1956, 1957, 1958, 1964, 1966, 1968, 1969, 1973, 1976, 1977, 1980, 1981, 1983, 1984, 1985, 1986, 1987, 1989, 1992, 1993, 1994, 1995, 1996, 2000, 2002, 2005, 2012, 2016, 2018
- Japan Cup:
  - Winners (2): 2020–21, 2021–22

== Current roster ==
Roster for the 2025–26 season.

Goaltenders

No.	Nat	Player	Pos	S/G	Age	Acquired	Birthplace
35	(Japan)	Takuto Onoda	G	L	34	2015	Eniwa-shi, Hokkaido
39	(Japan)	Yuta Narisawa	G	L	39	2010	Kushiro, Hokkaido
44	(Japan)	Eiki Sato	G	L	25	2024	Tomakomai, Hokkaido

Defensemen

No.	Nat	Player	Pos	S/G	Age	Acquired	Birthplace
4	(Japan)	Yutaka Toko	D	L	23	2025	Tokyo, Tokyo
6	(Japan)	Kotaro Yamada	D	L	34	2014	Tomakomai, Hokkaido
23	(Japan)	Taiki Takebe	D	R	26	2023	Tomakomai, Hokkaido
29	(Japan)	Jiei Halliday	D	R	29	2019	Utsunomiya, Tochigi
34	(Japan)	Ryo Hashimoto	D	L	33	2011	Iwanai, Hokkaido
43	(Japan)	Shunta Kimura	D	R	25	2024	Memuro, Hokkaido
72	(Japan)	Yusuke Kon (A)	D	R	27	2017	Tomakomai, Hokkaido
88	(Japan)	Kazumasa Sasaki	D	R	36	2009	Tomakomai, Hokkaido

Forwards

No.	Nat	Player	Pos	S/G	Age	Acquired	Birthplace
7	(Japan)	Yusaku Ando	F	R	22	2024	Tomakomai, Hokkaido
8	(Japan)	Seiji Takahashi	F	R	33	2011	Tomakomai, Hokkaido
9	(Japan)	Kenta Takagi	F	R	32	2019	Tomakomai, Hokkaido
10	(Japan)	Kohei Mitamura	F	L	34	2010	Obihiro, Hokkaido
14	(Japan)	Sota Isogai	F	L	25	2025	Karuizawa, Nagano
15	(Japan)	Taiga Irikura (A)	F	R	29	2022	Tomakomai, Hokkaido
16	(Japan)	Ryosuke Miura	F	L	25	2024	Tomakomai, Hokkaido
17	(Japan)	Masato Okubo	F	R	24	2025	Hachinohe, Aomori
19	(Japan)	Shogo Nakajima (C)	F	R	32	2019	Kushiro, Hokkaido
22	(Japan)	Teruto Nakajima	F	L	24	2025	Tomakomai, Hokkaido
90	(Japan)	Toi Kobayashi	F	L	27	2018	Tomakomai, Hokkaido
98	(Japan)	Hayato Aiki	F	L	27	2017	Tomakomai, Hokkaido

== Year-by-year record ==
Complete records for previous seasons:

Season	GP	W	W (OT)	W (pen)*	T	L (pen)*	L (OT)	L	GF	GA	Pts.	Finish	Playoffs
2003–04	16	5	0	—	2	—	0	9	55	58	17	4th of 5	Did not qualify
2004–05	42	24	2	—	2	—	1	13	181	124	79	4th of 8	Semi-finals
2005–06	38	22	0	—	4	—	2	10	159	87	72	4th of 9	Semi-finals
2006–07	34	20	0	—	4	—	1	9	141	80	65	3rd of 8	Quarter-finals
2007–08	30	17	1	—	2	—	2	8	112	74	57	3rd of 7	Champions
2008–09	36	21	1	2	—	2	0	10	141	77	71	3rd of 7	Semi-finals
2009–10	36	21	0	3	—	2	3	7	141	80	74	2nd of 7	Semi-finals
2010–11	36	21	3	2	—	3	0	7	161	91	76	1st of 7	Semi-finals
2011–12	36	21	1	2	—	4	2	6	141	82	75	1st of 7	Champions
2012–13	42	32	2	0	—	1	1	6	199	92	102	1st of 7	Runners-up
Totals	346	204	10	9	14	12	12	85	1431	845	—	—	2 Championships

*Prior to the 2008–09 season, there were no shoot-outs and games ended in a tie

== Past import players ==
- (Soviet Union) Vyacheslav Starshinov 1975–78, F
- (Soviet Union) Vladimir Shadrin 1979–1983, C
- (Soviet Union) Yuri Lyapkin 1979–1982, D
- (Soviet Union) Valery Belousov 1982–1984, F
- (Soviet Union) Irek Gimayev 1987–1991, D
- (Russia) Anatoli Fedotov 1995-96/1998-00, D (Former Jets/Mighty Ducks)
- (Russia) Vladimir Kramskoy 1995-00, D
- (Russia) Igor Dorofeyev 1998-00, F
- (Canada) Michael Yoshino 1997–99, F
- (Russia) Sergei Pryakhin 1998–99, RW (Former Flames)
- (Canada) Matt Oikawa 1999-00, RW
- (Russia) Sergei Bautin 2000–02, D (Former Jets/Red Wings/Sharks)
- (Canada) Aaron Keller 2002–, F
- (Canada) Burt Henderson 2003–07, D
- (Canada) Dusty Imoo 2003–06, G
- (Canada) Greg Parks 2003–04, RW (Former Islanders)
- (United States) Dan Daikawa 2004–05, D
- (Canada) Tavis Hansen 2004–05, RW (Former Jets/Coyotes)
- (Canada) Jason Podollan 2005–06, RW (Former Panthers/Maple Leafs/Kings/Islanders)
- (Canada) Jarrod Skalde 2006–07, C (Former Devils/Mighty Ducks/Flames/Sharks/Stars/Blackhawks/Thrashers/Flyers)
- (Canada) Shane Endicott 2007–09, C (Former Penguins)
- (Sweden) Ricard Persson 2007–09, D (Former Devils/Blues/Senators)
