= Nikkō Ice Bucks =

- City: Nikkō, Tochigi
- League: Asia League Ice Hockey
- Founded: 1999
- Home arena: Nikkō Kirifuri Ice Arena (capacity 2,000)
- Colours
- Owner: Kobayashi Sumio
- Head coach: Jesper Jalonen
- Captain: Kosuke Ohtsu
- Affiliates: Tampereen Ilves
- Website: www.icebucks.jp

The HC Tochigi Nikkō Ice Bucks (ホッケークラブ栃木日光アイスバックス, Hokkē Kurabu Tochigi Nikkō Aisu Bakkusu) is an Asia League Ice Hockey team based in Nikkō, Tochigi, Japan.

== History ==
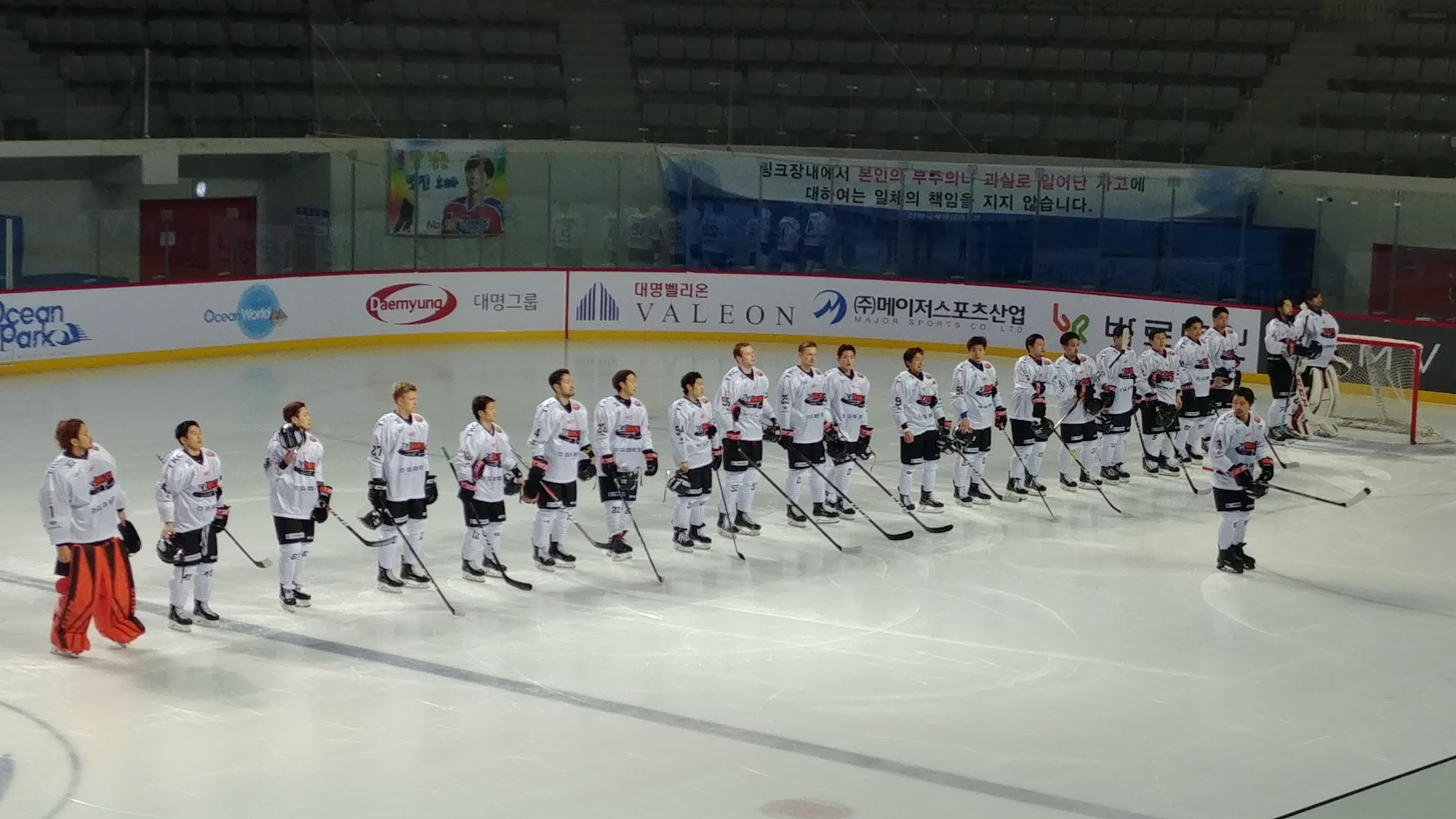
Nikko Icebucks in 2018

The Nikkō area has a long history of ice hockey, with the Furukawa Electric semi-professional team (one of the oldest in Japan) having been established in 1925, and becoming a founding member of the Japanese Ice Hockey League in 1966. In 1999, however, the team was forced to disband due to financial difficulties.

A outflow of support from the city and local financing allowed the team to be recreated as a club team, supported locally. It was renamed the HC Nikkō IceBucks and joined the league in time for the next season's start. The team, despite fervent local support, was never one of the successes of the JIHL even when they were supported as Furukawa Electric, and had a rocky start as the HC Nikkō IceBucks, having to relaunch their business model in 2001. The team has consistently placed near or at the bottom of the league.

When the league expanded into the Asia League Ice Hockey, Nikkō was one of the teams that was part of the new league. In the summer of 2005, the team arranged to play a number of its home games in Kobe, Hyogo, and changed its name to the Nikkō Kobe IceBucks to reflect its new two-city home. In 2007–2008 season Kobe is no longer home and the name was reverted to the older HC Nikkō Ice Bucks.

On January 29, 2020, It was announce that five players would represent Japan in the 3rd round of qualifiers for the 2022 Beijing Olympics.

== Honours ==
- Japan League championships: none
- Asia League championships: none
- All Japan Ice hockey Championship: 2015, 2019, 2023, 2024

== Year-by-year record ==
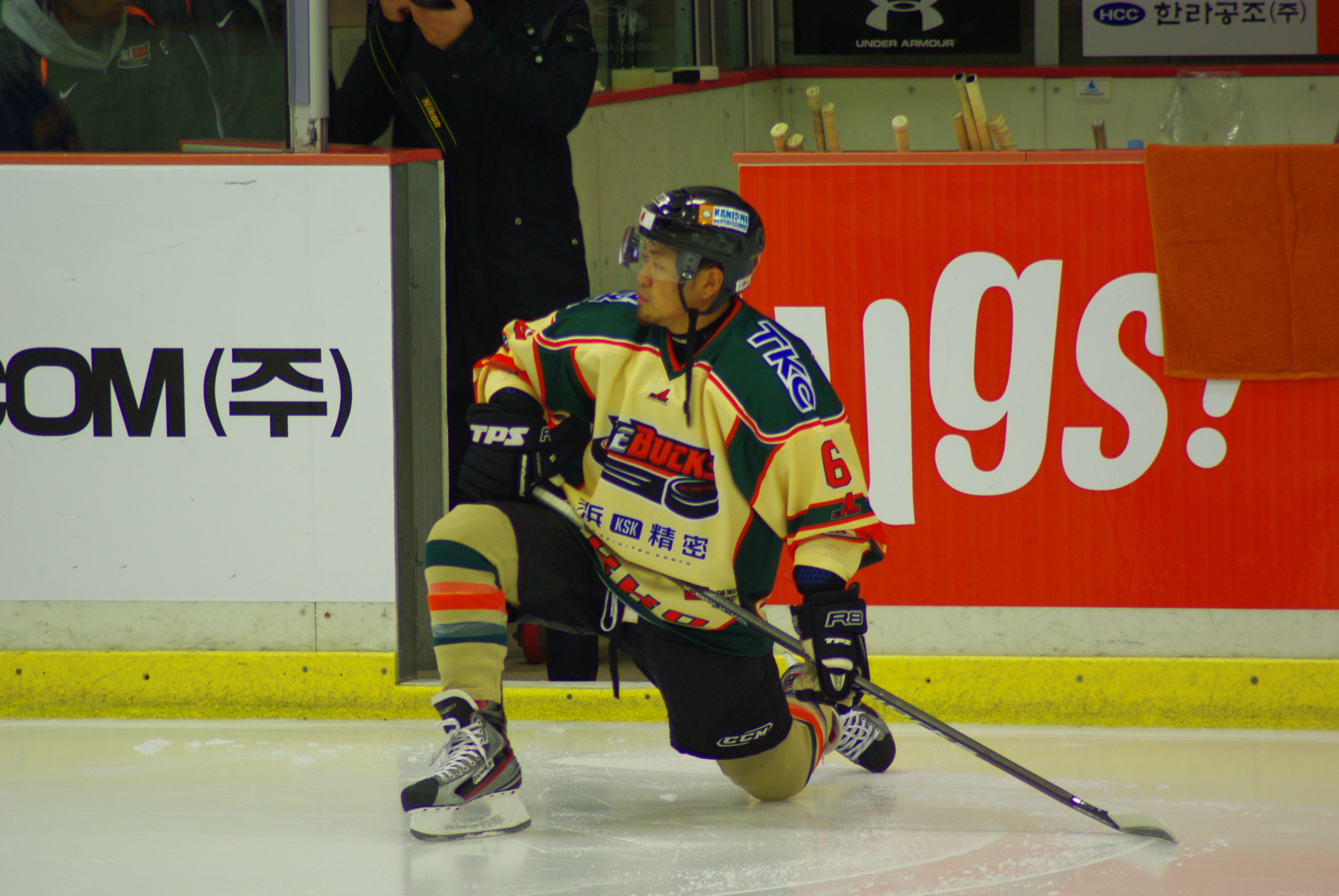
Sumida Yousuke wearing the team's away jersey which was introduced in 2011

=== JIHL 1999–2004 ===
Season	GP	W	W(OT)	W(PS)	T	L(PS)	L(OT)	L	GF	GA	PTS	Finish	Playoffs
1999-00	30	3			5			22	45	106	11	6th/6	Out of playoffs
2000–01	40	10			1			29	91	164	21	6th/6	Out of playoffs
2001–02	40	6	2	2		2	2	26	103	163	23.0	6th/6	Out of playoffs
2002–03	32	7	0	4		1	2	18	68	114	23.0	5th/5	Out of playoffs
2002–03	24	1	0	1		0	1	21	33	112	4.5	4th/4	?
2003–04	12	0	0	0		0	0	12	19	56	0.0	4th/4	?

=== ALIH 2003–present ===
complete records for previous seasons

Season	GP	W	W(OT)	W(GWS)*	T	L(GWS)*	L(OT)	L	GF	GA	PTS	Finish	Playoffs
2003–04	16	2	0	—	2	—	0	12	38	67	6	5th/5	No playoffs due to shortened season
2004–05	42	13	1	—	2	—	2	24	110	125	45	6th/8	–
2005–06	38	16	2	—	2	—	1	17	103	118	55	6th/9	Lost in quarter-final
2006–07	34	12	0	—	1	—	0	21	90	158	37	6th/8	Lost in semi-final
2007–08	30	8	2	—	2	—	0	18	60	109	30	6th/7	Lost in quarter-final
2008–09	36	4	2	1	—	1	1	27	74	161	20	7th/7	–
2009–10	36	12	2	1	—	2	2	17	103	118	46	6th/7	–
2010–11	36	10	3	1	—	0	2	20	95	112	40	6th/7	–
2011–12	36	18	0	4	—	0	1	13	158	103	63	3rd/7	–
2012–13	42	15	3	3	—	2	0	19	123	141	59	5th/7	–
Totals	346	110	15	10	9	5	9	188	954	1212	–	–	–

*prior to the 2008–2009 season, there were no shoot-outs and games ended in a tie

== Current roster ==
Roster for the 2026–27 season.

=== Goaltenders ===
No.	Nat	Player	Pos	S/G	Age	Acquired	Birthplace
31	(Japan)	Ryo Murakami	G	L	23	2026	Urahoro, Hokkaido
44	(Japan)	Yutaka Fukufuji	G	L	43	2010	Kushiro, Hokkaido
90	(Japan)	Issa Otsuka	G	L	22	2023	Nikkō, Tochigi

=== Defensemen ===
No.	Nat	Player	Pos	S/G	Age	Acquired	Birthplace
5	(Japan)	Takahiro Ishikawa	D	L	33	2016	Nikkō, Tochigi
8	(Japan)	Shuto Soma	D	R	30	2019	Sapporo, Hokkaido
9	(Japan)	Hiroto Sato (A)	D	L	32	2014	Kushiro, Hokkaido
10	(Japan)	Michihiro Kyoya	D	R	28	2026	Kushiro, Hokkaido
12	(Japan)	Mitsuo Fukuda	D	L	26	2021	Nikkō, Tochigi
20	(Japan)	Seiya Hayata (A)	D	L	30	2022	Hiroshima, Hiroshima
77	(Finland)	Joonas Uimonen	D	L	28	2025	Hämeenlinna, Finland

=== Forwards ===
No.	Nat	Player	Pos	S/G	Age	Acquired	Birthplace
11	(Japan)	Kosuke Otsu (C)	F	R	33	2024	Nikko, Tochigi
13	(Japan)	Keita Deguchi	F	L	26	2019	Tomakomai, Hokkaido
14	(Japan)	Madoka Suzuki	F	L	26	2025	Yokohama, Kanagawa
15	(Japan)	Kotaro Murase	RW	L	22	2025	Tokachi, Hokkaido
18	(Japan)	Makuru Furuhashi	LW	L	32	2016	Nikkō, Tochigi
21	(Japan)	Daisuke Miyata	F	R	25	2023	Obihiro, Hokkaido
29	(Japan)	Toshiyuki Ito	F	R	27	2022	Nagano, Nagano
34	(Japan)	Aito Iguchi	F	R	23	2025	Saitama, Saitama
40	(Finland)	Santtu Hakanen	F	L	25	2026	Tampere, Finland
48	(Japan)	Ryo Shimizu	F	L	28	2021	Obihiro, Hokkaido
76	(Switzerland)	Anthony Staiger (A)	F	R	33	2026	Kloten, Switzerland
81	(Japan)	Kento Suzuki (A)	F	L	31	2019	Sapporo, Hokkaido
88	(Japan)	Yuri Terao (A)	RW	R	31	2021	Nikkō, Tochigi

== Past import players ==
- (United States) Curt Bennett 1980–82, F
- (United States) Harvey Bennett, Jr. 1980–82, D
- (Czechoslovakia) Eduard Novák 1982–84, F
- (Czechoslovakia) František Kaberle Sr. 1982–84, D (father of František Kaberle and Tomáš Kaberle)
- (Canada) Mark Kaufmann 1999–03, C
- (Sweden) Patrik Degerstedt 1999–2001
- (Canada) Martin Kariya 2004–05, LW (Brother of Paul Kariya and Steve Kariya)
- (United States) Shjon Podein 2005–06, LW
- (United States) Chris Paradise 2005–06, C
- (Canada) Mike Henderson 2006–07, RW
- (Canada) Eric LaFreniere 2008–09, RW
- (Canada) Mickey Gilchrist 2008–09, C
- (Canada) Bud Smith 2009–11, C
- (Canada) Richard Rochefort 2010–11, D/C
- (Canada) Andrew Kozek 2011–12, LW
- (Finland) Petteri Nummelin 2017–18, D
