= Seibu Prince Rabbits =

- City: Nishitōkyō, Tokyo
- Founded: 1972
- Folded: 2009
- Home arena: DyDo Drinco Ice Arena (capacity 3,500)
- Colours: Blue, cyan, white
- Owner: Seibu Group
- General manager: Shinji Katsuta, (last)
- Head coach: Shinichi Iwasaki, (last)

The Seibu Prince Rabbits (SEIBUプリンス ラビッツ, Seibu Purinsu Rabittsu) were an Asia League Ice Hockey team based in Nishitōkyō City in Tokyo, Japan that was folded in 2009. The Rabbits played at the DyDo Drinco Ice Arena from 2006-2009. In December 2008, Prince Hotels, the team's owner, announced that the team would be folded at the conclusion of the 2008-09 season.

== History ==

The club was founded as the Kokudo Keikaku Ice Hockey Club in Karuizawa, Nagano in 1972. They won the Japan Ice Hockey League and All Japan Ice Hockey Championship in 1974. Since then, they have won the League 13 times and the All Japan Championship 11 times. They moved to Shinagawa, Tokyo in 1984, then to Yokohama, Kanagawa in 1991. They changed their name to the Kokudo Ice Hockey Club according to the change of their parent company's name. They merged with the Seibu Railways Ice Hockey Club in 2003 and moved to the Suntory Higashi-fushimi Ice Arena (renamed to DyDo Drinco Ice Arena in 2006 when the naming rights contract went to DyDo Drico) in Nishitokyo, Tokyo where Seibu had been based. Their parent company Kokudo ceased to exist in 2006 after a merger with Prince Hotels, Inc. They adopted the new name Seibu Prince Rabbits in 2006. The club also had a women's team called the Seibu Princess Rabbits.

On December 19, 2008, Prince Hotels & Resorts officially announced its intention to fold the team at the conclusion of the 2008-09 season, citing funding difficulties in a harsh economic climate.

Prince Hotels & Resorts negotiated with over twenty companies to find a new owner, but did not succeed due to the economic situation in Japan, and due to the declining popularity of ice hockey itself. Prince Hotels & Resorts announced the disbanding of the team as of March 31, 2009.

== Honours ==
- Asia League:
  - Winners (2): 2004-05, 2005–06
- Japan League:
  - Winners (13): 1974-75, 1977–78, 1985–86, 1988–89, 1991–92, 1992–93, 1994–95, 1997–98, 1998–99, 2000–01, 2001–02, 2002–03, 2003–04
- All Japan Championship:
  - Winners (11): 1975, 1982, 1988, 1990, 1997, 1998, 1999, 2003, 2004, 2008, 2009

== Notable players ==
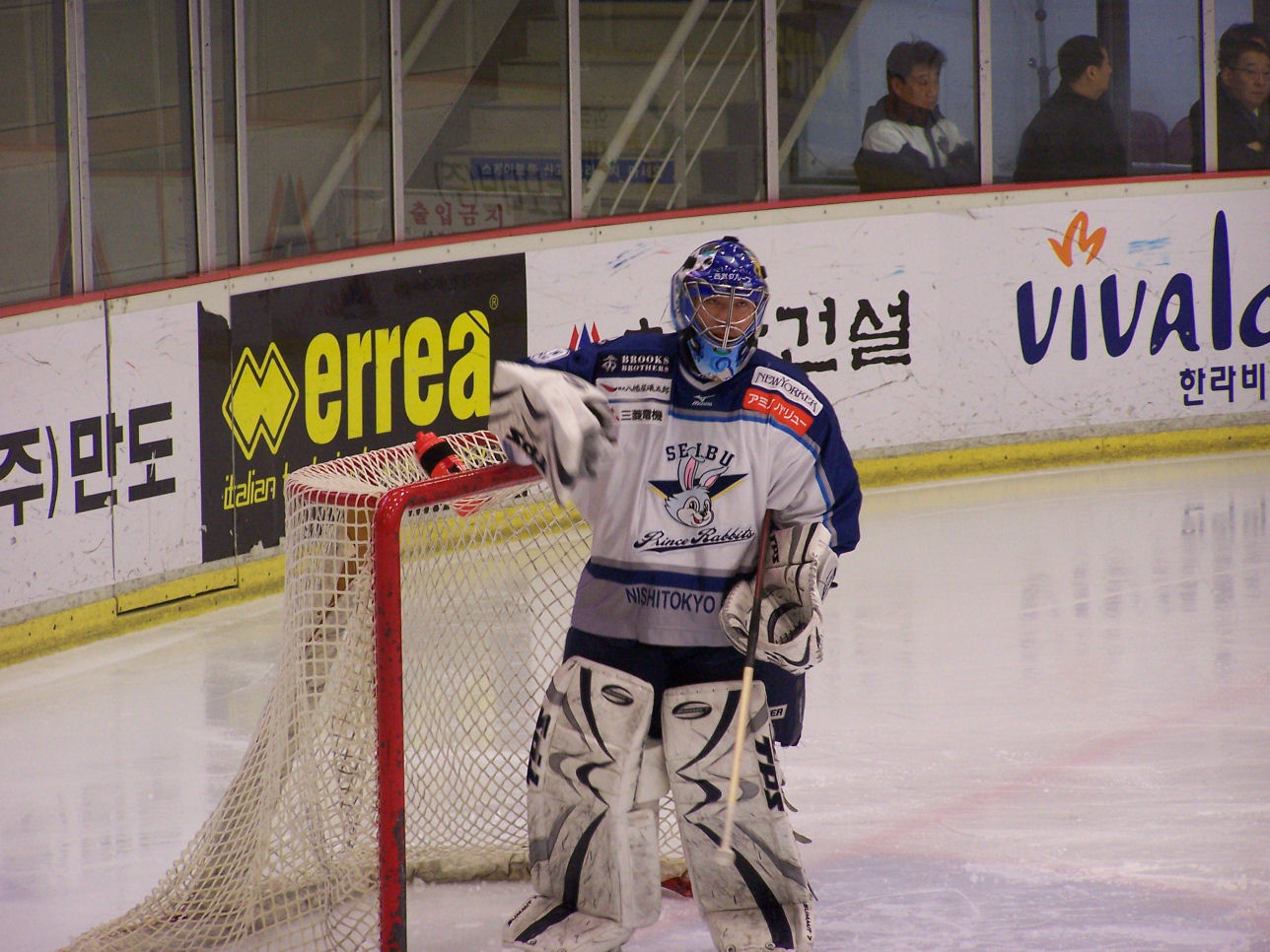
Naoya Kikuchi wearing the away jersey in the January 17, 2009 game vs Anyang Halla

- Hiroyuki Miura, drafted by the Montreal Canadiens in 1992, the first ever Japanese drafted into the NHL.
- Yutaka Fukufuji, who was drafted by the National Hockey League's Los Angeles Kings and became the first Japanese-born player to appear in an NHL game
- Juhani Tamminen, Finnish Ice Hockey Hall of Fame inductee and subsequently one of the most controversial ice hockey media personalities in Finland.
- Randy Gregg, played two seasons for Kokudo and subsequently would go on to win five Stanley Cups with Edmonton Oilers in the National Hockey League.

== Import players ==
- (Canada) Terry O'Malley 1972-1977, D
- (Canada) Mel Wakabayashi 1972-1978, F
- (Finland) Juhani Tamminen 1979-1980, 1982-1984, F
- (Canada) John Tucker 1997-2000, C
- (Canada) Chris Bright 2003-05, RW
- (United States) Dan Daikawa 2003-04, D
- (Canada) Joel Prpic 2003-2009, D (Former Bruins/Avalanche)
- (Canada) Chris Yule 2003-08, F
- (Canada) Richard Rochefort 2007-2009, C
