= 2022–23 Asia League Ice Hockey season =

2022–23 ALIH season
- League: Asia League Ice Hockey
- Sport: Ice hockey
- Duration: 3 September 2022 – 26 March 2023
- Number of games: 40
- Number of teams: 6

Regular season
- Leaders Flag: HL Anyang
- Runners-up: Red Eagles Hokkaido
- Top scorer: Shogo Nakajima (REH)

Playoffs
- Playoffs MVP: Kang Yoon-Seok (HLA)
- Finals champions: HL Anyang
- Runners-up: Red Eagles Hokkaido

Asia League Ice Hockey seasons
- ← 2021–22(Japan Cup) 2023–24 →

The 2022–23 Asia League Ice Hockey season was the 20th season of operation (18th season of play) of the Asia League Ice Hockey. The league returned after the past two seasons were only Japanese clubs played due to COVID-19 pandemic.

The regular season began on 3 September 2022, when the East Hokkaido Cranes hosted HL Anyang.

The playoffs concluded on 25 March, with HL Anyang defeating Red Eagles Hokkaido in the finals in five games, winning their seventh league championship in franchise history.

== Season changes ==
The Oji Eagles rebranded as Red Eagles Hokkaido back in 2021. The Daemyung Killer Whales folded in 2021. The Yokohama Grits make their league debut this season after their initial debut was postponed with the cancelation for the 2020–21 and 2021–22 seasons.

On 2 August 2022, the league voted to remove PSK Sakhalin in protest to the Russian invasion of Ukraine. On 15 September 2022, Anyang Halla announced that they rebranded to HL Anyang.

== Teams ==
Only five teams from the 2019–20 season returned for the 2022–23 season, with the addition of expansion side Yokohama Grits.

Team	City/Town	Arena	Capacity
HL Anyang	(South Korea) Anyang	Anyang Ice Arena	1,284
East Hokkaido Cranes	(Japan) Kushiro	Kushiro Ice Arena	2,539
Red Eagles Hokkaido	(Japan) Tomakomai	Hakucho Arena	3,015
Nikkō Ice Bucks	(Japan) Nikkō	Nikkō Kirifuri Ice Arena	1,608
Tohoku Free Blades	(Japan) Hachinohe	Flat Hachinohe	3,500
Yokohama Grits	(Japan) Yokohama	KOSÉ Shin-Yokohama Skate Center	2,500

== Regular season ==
The league's regular season began on 3 September 2022.

=== Standings ===
Pos	Team	Pld	W	OTW	OTL	L	GF	GA	GD	Pts	Qualification
1	HL Anyang	40	31	0	4	5	166	64	+102	97	Regular season champions Qualification to playoffs
2	Red Eagles Hokkaido	40	24	6	2	8	167	84	+83	86	Qualification to playoffs
3	Nikkō IceBucks	40	17	5	3	15	126	114	+12	64	Qualification to playoffs
4	East Hokkaido Cranes	40	12	4	3	21	116	142	−26	47	Qualification to playoffs
5	Tohoku Free Blades	40	8	2	6	24	92	175	−83	34	
6	Yokohama Grits	40	8	3	2	27	98	186	−88	32	

Updated to match(es) played on 3 April 2023. Source: Asia League
Rules for classification: 1) Points; 2) Games won in regulation time; 3) Number of games won; 4) Head-to-head results, ranked by criteria 1 to 3; 5) Fewest regulation losses; 6) Away game results, ranked by criteria 1 to 3; 7) Goals scored; 8) Goal difference; 9) Fewest penalty minutes; 10) Drawing of lots.

=== Results ===
Home \ Away	HLA	EHC	REH	NIB	TFB	YGR	HLA	EHC	REH	NIB	TFB	YGR	HLA	EHC	REH	NIB	TFB	YGR	HLA	EHC	REH	NIB	TFB	YGR	HLA	EHC	REH	NIB	TFB	YGR	HLA	EHC	REH	NIB	TFB	YGR
HL Anyang	—	1–2	2–3 (Note: Shootout)	1–4	4–0	9–2	—	4–1	2–3	7–2	10–1	4–2	—	3–2	4–2				—	1–2	4–1				—						—					
East Hokkaido Cranes	5–8	—	2–4	2–0	10–1	6–1	1–7	—	2–7	4–1	4–1	6–2	2–3	—			3–4 (Note: Overtime)		2–4	—			4–1			—			4–3			—			4–1	
Red Eagles Hokkaido	3–5		—		6–2	7–1	1–0		—		2–3	7–1	1–3		—			4–3	3–4		—			6–1			—						—			
Nikkō Ice Bucks	0–4	4–0	2–3	—	5–0	4–1	1–2	5–4	0–3	—	6–1	4–5			3–2	—		6–2			2–1	—		5–1				—						—		
Tohoku Free Blades		3–4	5–7	0–2	—	3–2		3–4	2–8	4–5	—	1–2		3–4		1–2	—			4–3		6–5	—						—						—	
Yokohama Grits	0–2	4–5	2–3	3–6	4–2	—	0–7	5–3	1–7	2–5	6–3	—				3–4		—				1–6		—						—						—

Updated to match(es) played on 25 December 2022. Source: ALIH
Legend: Blue = home team win; Yellow = draw; Red = away team win.

== Playoffs ==
=== Bracket ===
Semifinal
1	HL Anyang	2
4	East Hokkaido Cranes	0
2	Red Eagles Hokkaido	2
3	Nikkō IceBucks	0

Final
1	HL Anyang	3
2	Red Eagles Hokkaido	2

=== Semifinals ===
==== (1) HL Anyang vs. (4) East Hokkaido Cranes ====
9 March 2023	East Hokkaido Cranes	1 – 4	HL Anyang	Anyang Ice Center	Recap
No scoring		First period	15:40 – Song Jong-hun (1)
No scoring		Second period	6:58 – Lee Jong-min (1)
Sota Isogai (1) – 1:43		Third period	12:56 – pp – Ahn Jin-hui (1); 16:14 – Kang Yoon-seok (1)
Yuya Wakimoto (38 saves / 42 shots)		Goalie stats	Matt Dalton (22 saves / 23 shots)

11 March 2023	East Hokkaido Cranes	0 – 2	HL Anyang	Anyang Ice Center	Recap
No scoring		First period	4:22 – pp – Ahn Jin-hui (2)
No scoring		Second period	No scoring
No scoring		Third period	2:45 – Lee Jong-min (2)
Yuya Wakimoto (36 saves / 38 shots)		Goalie stats	Matt Dalton (29 saves / 29 shots)

HL Anyang won series 2–0

==== (2) Red Eagles Hokkaido vs. (3) Nikkō Ice Bucks ====
9 March 2023	Nikkō Ice Bucks	1 – 3	Red Eagles Hokkaido	Nikkō Kirifuri Ice Arena	Recap
No scoring		First period	11:36 – Kohei Mitamura (1)
No scoring		Second period	2:01 – Yuto Osawa (1); 16:40 – Shuhei Kuji (1)
Tetsuya Saito (1) – 18:48		Third period	No scoring
Yutaka Fukufuji (28 saves / 31 shots)		Goalie stats	Yuta Narisawa (20 saves / 21 shots)

11 March 2023	Nikkō Ice Bucks	1 – 2	Red Eagles Hokkaido	Nikkō Kirifuri Ice Arena	Recap
No scoring		First period	No scoring
No scoring		Second period	6:23 – pp – Shuhei Kuji (2)
Yuta Suzuki (1) – pp – 12:36		Third period	4:26 – Kenta Takagi (1)
Yutaka Fukufuji (28 saves / 30 shots)		Goalie stats	Yuta Narisawa (30 saves / 31 shots)

Hokkaido won series 2–0

=== Final ===
==== (1) HL Anyang vs. (2) Red Eagles Hokkaido ====
18 March 2023	HL Anyang	1 – 4	Red Eagles Hokkaido	Nikkō Kirifuri Ice Arena	Recap
No scoring		First period	15:05 – Ryo Hashimoto (1); 16:10 – pp – Ryo Hashimoto (2)
No scoring		Second period	No scoring
Jeon Jung-woo (1) – 8:30		Third period	11:51 – pp – Yushi Nakayashiki (1); 16:50 – Shogo Nakajima (1)
Matt Dalton (19 saves / 23 shots)		Goalie stats	Takuto Onoda (25 saves / 26 shots)

19 March 2023	HL Anyang	4 – 1	Red Eagles Hokkaido	Nikkō Kirifuri Ice Arena	Recap
Kim Sang-wook (1) – 11:28		First period	No scoring
Lee Juh-yung (1) – 6:15; Lee Young-jun (1) – 7:32		Second period	13:13 – Shogo Nakajima (2)
Song Hyeong-cheol (1) – pp – 8:46		Third period	No scoring
Matt Dalton (28 saves / 29 shots)		Goalie stats	Takuto Onoda (22 saves / 26 shots)

23 March 2023	Red Eagles Hokkaido	2 – 5	HL Anyang	Anyang Ice Center	Recap
No scoring		First period	2:19 – Lee Juh-yung (2)
Kazumasa Sasaki (1) – 13:05		Second period	13:23 – Kim Ki-sung (1)
Yushi Nakayashiki (2) – 0:50		Third period	6:18 – Kim Ki-sung (2); 15:41 – pp – Lee Young-jun (2); 19:18 – en – Lee Jong-min (3)
Yuta Narisawa (28 saves / 33 shots)		Goalie stats	Matt Dalton (22 saves / 24 shots)

25 March 2023	Red Eagles Hokkaido	1 – 0	HL Anyang	Anyang Ice Center	Recap
Ryo Hashimoto (3) – 3:05		First period	No scoring
No scoring		Second period	No scoring
No scoring		Third period	No scoring
Yuta Narisawa (28 saves / 28 shots)		Goalie stats	Matt Dalton (32 saves / 33 shots)

25 March 2023	Red Eagles Hokkaido	1 – 2	2OT	HL Anyang	Anyang Ice Center	Recap
No scoring		First period		4:00 – Kim Ki-sung (3)
Ryo Hashimoto (3) – 3:05		Second period		No scoring
No scoring		Third period		No scoring
No scoring		Second overtime period		10:13 – Kang Yoon-seok (1)
Yuta Narisawa (48 saves / 50 shots)		Goalie stats		Matt Dalton (31 saves / 32 shots)

Anyang won series 3–2

== Statistics ==
=== Scoring leaders ===
The following shows the top players who led the league in points, at the conclusion of matches played on 5 March 2023.

Player	Team	GP	G	A	Pts	+/–	PIM
(Japan) Shogo Nakajima	Red Eagles Hokkaido	40	22	53	75	+3	18
(Japan) Makuru Furuhashi	Nikkō Ice Bucks	40	27	31	58	+2	28
(South Korea) Kim Sang-wook	HL Anyang	40	12	42	54	+7	18
(Japan) Kento Suzuki	Nikkō Ice Bucks	40	30	22	52	+2	26
(South Korea) Kim Ki-sung	HL Anyang	40	25	25	50	+14	4
(Japan) Yuto Osawa	Red Eagles Hokkaido	40	18	31	49	+3	12
(Japan) Ryo Hashimoto	Red Eagles Hokkaido	40	4	44	48	+3	14
(Japan) Seiji Takahashi	Red Eagles Hokkaido	37	20	26	46	+4	16
(Japan) Yushi Nakayashiki	Red Eagles Hokkaido	39	29	14	43	+3	39
(Japan) Kosuke Ohtsu	East Hokkaido Cranes	40	19	24	43	+1	24

=== Leading goaltenders ===
The following shows the top goaltenders who led the league in goals against average, provided that they have played at least 40% of their team's minutes, at the conclusion of matches played on 5 March 2023.

Player	Team	GP	TOI	GA	Sv%	GAA
(South Korea) Matt Dalton	HL Anyang	37	2198:33	53	94.22	1.45
(Japan) Yuta Narisawa	Red Eagles Hokkaido	33	1946:47	65	92.17	2.00
(Japan) Roman Bengert	Nikkō Ice Bucks	20	1162:48	64	88.93	3.30
(Japan) Yuya Wakimoto	East Hokkaido Cranes	24	1290:21	73	89.12	3.39
(Japan) Michikazu Hata	Tohoku Free Blades	25	1377:40	93	90.11	4.05

== Awards ==
Award	Winner
League champions	HL Anyang
Most valuable player	Matt Dalton, HL Anyang
Best goaltender	Matt Dalton, HL Anyang
Rookie of the year	Kanata Isoya, East Hokkaido Cranes
Leading scorer (Regular season)	Kento Suzuki, Nikkō IceBucks
Leading assists (Regular season)	Shogo Nakajima, Red Eagles Hokkaido
Leading points (Regular season)	Shogo Nakajima, Red Eagles Hokkaido

=== Team of the year ===
First Team

- Matt Dalton (G) – HL Anyang
- Ryo Hashimoto (D) – Red Eagles Hokkaido
- Lee Don-ku (D) – HL Anyang
- Shogo Nakajima (F) – Red Eagles Hokkaido
- Kento Suzuki (F) – Nikkō IceBucks
- Kim Ki-sung (F) – HL Anyang
