= 2024–25 Asia League Ice Hockey season =

2024–25 AL season
- League: Asia League Ice Hockey
- Sport: Ice hockey
- Duration: 7 September 2024 – 23 March 2025 (Regular season) 29 March 2025 – 5 April 2025 (Finals)
- Games: 80
- Teams: 5

Regular season
- Leaders Flag: HL Anyang
- Runners-up: Red Eagles Hokkaido
- Season MVP: Kim Sang-wook (Anyang)
- Top scorer: Makuru Furuhashi (Nikkō) (51 points)

Japan Cup
- Winners: Nikkō IceBucks (1st title)
- Runners-up: Red Eagles Hokkaido

Finals
- Champions: HL Anyang
- Runners-up: Red Eagles Hokkaido
- Finals MVP: Matt Dalton (Anyang)

Asia League Ice Hockey seasons
- ← 2023–24 2025–26 →

The 2024–25 Asia League Ice Hockey season was the 22nd season of operation (20th season of play) of Asia League Ice Hockey (AL). The regular season began on 7 September 2024.

== League business ==
=== Teams ===
The same five teams from the 2023–24 season returned for the 2024–25 season.

| Team | City/Town | Arena | Capacity | Previous season |
|---|---|---|---|---|
| HL Anyang | (South Korea) Anyang | Anyang Ice Arena | 1,284 | 1st |
| Red Eagles Hokkaido | (Japan) Tomakomai | Hakucho Arena | 3,015 | 2nd |
| Nikkō Ice Bucks | (Japan) Nikkō | Nikkō Kirifuri Ice Arena | 1,608 | 4th |
| Tohoku Free Blades | (Japan) Hachinohe | Flat Hachinohe | 3,500 | 3rd |
| Yokohama Grits | (Japan) Yokohama | KOSÉ Shin-Yokohama Skate Center | 2,500 | 5th |

=== Coaching changes ===
Pre-season
| Team | Departing Coach | New Coach | Reference |
|---|---|---|---|
| Tohoku Free Blades | Greg Puhalski | Chris Wakabayashi | |
| Yokohama Grits | Jeff Flanagan | Yuji Iwamoto | |

== Regular season ==
The league's regular season began on 7 September 2024 and ended on 23 March 2025. HL Anyang won their third consecutive, eighth overall regular season championship. Kim Sang-wook was named the regular season MVP.

=== Standings ===
| Pos | Team | Pld | W | OTW | OTL | L | GF | GA | GD | Pts | Qualification |
|---|---|---|---|---|---|---|---|---|---|---|---|
| 1 | HL Anyang | 32 | 18 | 1 | 6 | 7 | 115 | 77 | +38 | 62 | Regular season champions Qualification to finals |
| 2 | Red Eagles Hokkaido | 32 | 14 | 7 | 2 | 9 | 113 | 96 | +17 | 58 | Qualification to finals |
| 3 | Nikkō IceBucks | 32 | 13 | 6 | 3 | 10 | 118 | 107 | +11 | 54 | |
| 4 | Tohoku Free Blades | 32 | 9 | 2 | 3 | 18 | 89 | 121 | −32 | 34 | |
| 5 | Yokohama Grits | 32 | 8 | 2 | 4 | 18 | 73 | 107 | −34 | 32 | |

Source: AL
Rules for classification: 1) Points; 2) Games won in regulation time; 3) Number of games won; 4) Head-to-head results, ranked by criteria 1 to 3; 5) Fewest regulation losses; 6) Away game results, ranked by criteria 1 to 3; 7) Goals scored; 8) Goal difference; 9) Fewest penalty minutes; 10) Drawing of lots.

=== Statistics ===
==== Scoring leaders ====
The following shows the top players who led the league in points, at the conclusion of the regular season.

| Player | Team | GP | G | A | Pts | +/– | PIM |
|---|---|---|---|---|---|---|---|
| (Japan) Makuru Furuhashi | Nikkō Ice Bucks | 32 | 18 | 33 | 51 | +2 | 26 |
| (South Korea) Kim Sang-wook | HL Anyang | 32 | 14 | 27 | 41 | +4 | 16 |
| (Japan) Kento Suzuki | Nikkō Ice Bucks | 30 | 20 | 21 | 41 | +2 | 31 |
| (Japan) Shogo Nakajima | Red Eagles Hokkaido | 31 | 20 | 18 | 38 | +2 | 6 |
| (Japan) Sota Isogai | Nikkō Ice Bucks | 32 | 16 | 20 | 36 | +2 | 14 |
| (Japan) Yuri Terao | Nikkō Ice Bucks | 32 | 14 | 20 | 34 | +1 | 30 |
| (South Korea) Kang Yeon-seok | HL Anyang | 32 | 13 | 19 | 32 | +2 | 12 |
| (South Korea) Ahn Jin-hui | HL Anyang | 32 | 14 | 17 | 31 | +4 | 8 |
| (Japan) Toi Kobayashi | Red Eagles Hokkaido | 32 | 15 | 16 | 31 | +2 | 24 |
| (Japan) Yuto Osawa | Yokohama Grits | 32 | 7 | 24 | 31 | +1 | 18 |

==== Leading goaltenders ====
The following shows the top goaltenders who led the league in save percentage, provided that they have played at least 40% of their team's minutes, at the conclusion of the regular season.

| Player | Team | GP | TOI | GA | Sv% | GAA |
|---|---|---|---|---|---|---|
| (Japan) Issa Otsuka | Nikkō Ice Bucks | 25 | 1424:28 | 60 | 92.81 | 2.53 |
| (Japan) Kai Tomita | Yokohama Grits | 21 | 1193:18 | 56 | 91.70 | 2.82 |
| (Japan) Yuta Narisawa | Red Eagles Hokkaido | 26 | 1542:46 | 68 | 91.20 | 2.64 |
| (South Korea) Matt Dalton | HL Anyang | 18 | 1078:56 | 42 | 90.99 | 2.34 |
| (South Korea) Lee Yeon-seung | HL Anyang | 16 | 863:06 | 32 | 90.99 | 2.22 |
| (Japan) Takayuki Ito | Tohoku Free Blades | 21 | 1194:19 | 69 | 90.07 | 3.47 |
| (Japan) Michikazu Hata | Tohoku Free Blades | 13 | 720:39 | 43 | 89.51 | 3.58 |

== Finals ==
The Finals was competed in a best-of-five series following a 2–2–1–1–1 format. HL Anyang and Red Eagles Hokkaido met in the Finals for the third consecutive season. HL Anyang won the Finals in 4 games to claim their ninth league championship.

=== Finals ===
==== (1) HL Anyang vs. (2) Red Eagles Hokkaido ====
| 29 March 2025 | HL Anyang | 3–2 | 2OT | Red Eagles Hokkaido | Nikkō Kirifuri Ice Arena | Recap |
| Lee Hyun-seung (1) – 1:27 | | First period | | 18:20 – pp – Taiga Irikura (1) |
| Kim Gun-woo (1) – 4:38 | | Second period | | No scoring |
| No scoring | | Third period | | 14:44 – Seiji Takahashi (1) |
| Nam Hee-doo (1) – 1:22 | | Second overtime period | | No scoring |
| Matt Dalton (32 saves / 34 shots) | | Goalie stats | | Yuta Narisawa (29 saves / 32 shots) |

| 30 March 2025 | HL Anyang | 2–3 | OT | Red Eagles Hokkaido | Nikkō Kirifuri Ice Arena | Recap |
| No scoring | | First period | | No scoring |
| Lee Hyun-seung (1) – 7:21; Kim Sang-wook (1) – 17:34 | | Second period | | 18:45 – Bobby McIntyre (1) |
| No scoring | | Third period | | 1:46 – Shogo Nakajima (1) |
| No scoring | | First overtime period | | 1:49 – Kenta Takagi (1) |
| Matt Dalton (30 saves / 33 shots) | | Goalie stats | | Yuta Narisawa (22 saves / 24 shots) |

| 3 April 2025 | Red Eagles Hokkaido | 1–5 | HL Anyang | Anyang Ice Center | Recap |
| No scoring | | First period | 16:00 – pp – Nam Hee-doo (1); 18:38 – pp – Ahn Jin-hee (1) |
| Kohei Mitamura (1) – pp – 15:50 | | Second period | 11:16 – Kang Min-wan (1) |
| No scoring | | Third period | 3:03 – Kang Min-wan (2); 15:05 – en – Lee Don-ku (1) |
| Yuta Narisawa (31 saves / 36 shots) | | Goalie stats | Matt Dalton (31 saves / 32 shots) |

| 5 April 2025 | Red Eagles Hokkaido | 1–2 | OT | HL Anyang | Anyang Ice Center | Recap |
| No scoring | | First period | | No scoring |
| Toi Kobayashi (1) – pp – 8:43 | | Second period | | No scoring |
| No scoring | | Third period | | 3:30 – Lee Hyun-seung (1) |
| No scoring | | First overtime period | | 10:29 – Kang Min-wan (1) |
| Yuta Narisawa (39 saves / 41 shots) | | Goalie stats | | Matt Dalton (31 saves / 32 shots) |

| Anyang won the series 3–1 |

== Japan Cup ==
The Japan Cup, an in-season tournament exclusively for the Japanese-based teams, started on 30 November 2024, and ended on 29 December 2024, with Nikkō IceBucks claiming the championship.

=== Standings ===
| Pos | Team | Pld | W | OTW | OTL | L | GF | GA | GD | Pts | Qualification |
|---|---|---|---|---|---|---|---|---|---|---|---|
| 1 | Nikkō IceBucks | 6 | 4 | 0 | 0 | 2 | 21 | 18 | +3 | 12 | Japan Cup champions |
| 2 | Red Eagles Hokkaido | 6 | 2 | 1 | 2 | 1 | 25 | 21 | +4 | 10 | |
| 3 | Yokohama Grits | 5 | 1 | 1 | 1 | 2 | 15 | 15 | 0 | 6 | |
| 4 | Tohoku Free Blades | 5 | 1 | 1 | 0 | 3 | 13 | 20 | −7 | 5 | |

Updated to match(es) played on 29 December 2024. Source: AL
Rules for classification: 1) Points; 2) Games won in regulation time; 3) Number of games won; 4) Head-to-head results, ranked by criteria 1 to 3; 5) Fewest regulation losses; 6) Away game results, ranked by criteria 1 to 3; 7) Goals scored; 8) Goal difference; 9) Fewest penalty minutes; 10) Drawing of lots.

=== Statistics ===
==== Scoring leaders ====
The following shows the top players who led the league in points, at the conclusion of matches played on 29 December 2024.

| Player | Team | GP | G | A | Pts | +/– | PIM |
|---|---|---|---|---|---|---|---|
| (Japan) Atsuki Ikeda | Yokohama Grits | 6 | 5 | 7 | 12 | +3 | 0 |
| (Japan) Yusaku Ando | Red Eagles Hokkaido | 6 | 1 | 8 | 9 | +2 | 0 |
| (Japan) Makuru Furuhashi | Nikkō Ice Bucks | 5 | 3 | 5 | 8 | +2 | 6 |
| (Japan) Maito Omuku | Nikkō Ice Bucks | 6 | 3 | 5 | 8 | +1 | 2 |
| (Japan) Yuto Osawa | Yokohama Grits | 6 | 4 | 4 | 8 | +3 | 4 |
| (Japan) Kai Sugimoto | Yokohama Grits | 6 | 4 | 4 | 8 | +2 | 6 |

==== Leading goaltenders ====
The following shows the top goaltenders who led the league in save percentage, provided that they have played at least 40% of their team's minutes, at the conclusion of matches played on 29 December 2024.

| Player | Team | GP | TOI | GA | Sv% | GAA |
|---|---|---|---|---|---|---|
| (Japan) Issa Otuska | Nikkō Ice Bucks | 3 | 144:10 | 4 | 94.59 | 1.66 |
| (Japan) Shun Furukawa | Yokohama Grits | 2 | 103:11 | 4 | 94.29 | 2.33 |
| (Japan) Takayuki Ito | Tohoku Free Blades | 3 | 181:00 | 9 | 92.31 | 2.98 |
| (Japan) Kai Tomita | Yokohama Grits | 5 | 262:47 | 14 | 90.73 | 3.20 |
| (Japan) Yutaka Fukufuji | Nikkō Ice Bucks | 3 | 153:23 | 10 | 88.64 | 3.91 |

== Awards ==
| Award | Winner |
|---|---|
| League champions | HL Anyang |
| Most valuable player (Finals) | Matt Dalton (HL Anyang) |
| Most valuable player (Regular season) | Kim Sang-wook (HL Anyang) |
| Best goaltender | Issa Otsuka (Nikkō Ice Bucks) |
| Rookie of the year | Kai Tomita (Yokohama Grits) |
| Leading scorer (Regular season) | Shogo Nakajima (Red Eagles Hokkaido); Kento Suzuki (Nikkō Ice Bucks) |
| Leading assists (Regular season) | Makuru Furuhashi (Nikkō Ice Bucks) |
| Leading points (Regular season) | Makuru Furuhashi (Nikkō Ice Bucks) |

=== First team ===
| Position | Best 6 |
|---|---|
| G | Issa Otsuka, (Nikkō Ice Bucks) |
| D | Hiroto Sato (Nikkō Ice Bucks) |
| D | Ryo Hashimoto (Red Eagles Hokkaido) |
| F | Makuru Furuhashi (Nikkō Ice Bucks) |
| F | Shogo Nakajima (Red Eagles Hokkaido) |
| F | Yuri Terao (Nikkō Ice Bucks) |

== See also ==
- 2025 Asian Winter Games
- 2024–25 KHL season
