= 2023–24 Asia League Ice Hockey season =

2023–24 ALIH season
- League: Asia League Ice Hockey
- Sport: Ice hockey
- Duration: 16 September 2023 – 6 April 2024
- Number of games: 80
- Number of teams: 5

Regular season
- Leaders Flag: HL Anyang
- Runners-up: Red Eagles Hokkaido
- Season MVP: Lee Chong-min (HLA)
- Top scorer: Kim Sang-wook (HLA) (48 points)

Playoffs
- Playoffs MVP: Shin Sang-woo (HLA)
- Finals champions: HL Anyang
- Runners-up: Red Eagles Hokkaido

Asia League Ice Hockey seasons
- ← 2022–23 2024–25 →

The 2023–24 Asia League Ice Hockey season was the 21st season of operation (19th season of play) of the Asia League Ice Hockey.

The regular season began on 16 September 2023 when the defending champions HL Anyang host Red Eagles Hokkaido. The season concluded on 6 April 2024 with HL Anyang defeating the Red Eagles Hokkaido in 4 games to clinch their eighth championship.

== Season changes ==
The league dropped the East Hokkaido Cranes on 17 July 2023 after the team could not resolve outstanding salary issues from the previous season.

Only two teams qualify for the playoffs this season due to the reduced number of participating teams.

== Teams ==
Only five teams from the 2022–23 season returned for the 2023–24 season after East Hokkaido Cranes folded.

Team	City/Town	Arena	Capacity
HL Anyang	(South Korea) Anyang	Anyang Ice Arena	1,284
Red Eagles Hokkaido	(Japan) Tomakomai	Hakucho Arena	3,015
Nikkō Ice Bucks	(Japan) Nikkō	Nikkō Kirifuri Ice Arena	1,608
Tohoku Free Blades	(Japan) Hachinohe	Flat Hachinohe	3,500
Yokohama Grits	(Japan) Yokohama	KOSÉ Shin-Yokohama Skate Center	2,500

== Regular season ==
The league's regular season began on 16 September 2023 and ended on 24 March 2024, which HL Anyang clinching their seventh regular season championship.

=== Standings ===
Pos	Team	Pld	W	OTW	OTL	L	GF	GA	GD	Pts	Qualification
1	HL Anyang	32	22	1	3	6	126	81	+45	71	Regular season champions Qualification to playoffs
2	Red Eagles Hokkaido	32	21	1	0	10	124	78	+46	65	Qualification to playoffs
3	Tohoku Free Blades	32	14	2	2	14	101	107	−6	48	
4	Nikkō IceBucks	32	12	3	1	16	99	118	−19	43	
5	Yokohama Grits	32	3	1	2	26	78	144	−66	13	

Source: Asia League
Rules for classification: 1) Points; 2) Games won in regulation time; 3) Number of games won; 4) Head-to-head results, ranked by criteria 1 to 3; 5) Fewest regulation losses; 6) Away game results, ranked by criteria 1 to 3; 7) Goals scored; 8) Goal difference; 9) Fewest penalty minutes; 10) Drawing of lots.

=== Results ===
Teams play each other eight times, four at home and four away.

Home \ Away	HLA	REH	NIB	TFB	YGR
HL Anyang	—	5–4	6–0	5–2	7–2
HL Anyang	—	6–3	5–3	3–2	2–3 (Note: Shootout)
HL Anyang	—	2–6	1–3	3–0	4–2
HL Anyang	—	3–1	4–2	7–2	4–2
Red Eagles Hokkaido	2–1	—	1–2	7–2	6–1
Red Eagles Hokkaido	4–0	—	6–4	4–1	3–1
Red Eagles Hokkaido	2–5	—	6–3	3–4	5–3
Red Eagles Hokkaido	3–6	—	6–3	6–2	4–0
Nikkō Ice Bucks	3–4	2–5	—	4–2	6–5 (Note: Overtime)
Nikkō Ice Bucks	1–3	1–2	—	4–6	4–2
Nikkō Ice Bucks	6–4	2–8	—	3–2	1–8
Nikkō Ice Bucks	3–2	3–0	—	2–4	7–5
Tohoku Free Blades	5–4	2–4	3–4	—	7–2
Tohoku Free Blades	2–4	4–1	1–0	—	3–1
Tohoku Free Blades	0–3	1–6	4–6	—	6–4
Tohoku Free Blades	1–0	3–4	5–2	—	5–1
Yokohama Grits	3–6	0–2	0–5	3–5	—
Yokohama Grits	2–5	4–2	0–3	3–6	—
Yokohama Grits	5–6	2–5	4–5	2–4	—
Yokohama Grits	2–6	0–3	4–2	2–5	—

Source: ALIH
Legend: Blue = home team win; Yellow = draw; Red = away team win.

== Playoffs ==
The two teams that finished at the top of the regular season were the only teams participating in the 2024 playoffs. The Finals were competed in a best-of-five series following a 2–2–1–1–1 format. The regular season runners-up hosted games one and two, and the first place team hosted games three and four (game five, was not necessary).

=== Finals ===
==== (1) HL Anyang vs. (2) Red Eagles Hokkaido ====
30 March 2024	HL Anyang	5–4	3OT	Red Eagles Hokkaido	Nikkō Kirifuri Ice Arena	Recap
No scoring		First period		No scoring
No scoring		Second period		19:59 – pp – Taiga Irikura (1)
Song Jong-hun (1) – pp – 2:56; Shin Sang-woo (1) – 11:45; Nam Hee-doo (1) 17:12		Third period		16:08 – pp – Taiga Irikura (2); 19:15 – Yushi Nakayashiki (1)
Matt Dalton (53 saves / 57 shots)		Goalie stats		Yuta Narisawa (46 saves / 51 shots)

31 March 2024	HL Anyang	5–2	Red Eagles Hokkaido	Nikkō Kirifuri Ice Arena	Recap
No scoring		First period	13:59 – Kenta Takagi (1)
Ahn Jin-hui (1) – pp – 5:01		Second period	No scoring
Shin Sang-woo (1) – 1:26; Lee Chong-min (1) – 3:30; Lee Chong-min (2) – 14:52; Kang Yeon-seok (1) – en – 19:08		Third period	7:54 – Toi Kobayashi (1)
Matt Dalton (29 saves / 31 shots)		Goalie stats	Takuto Onoda (26 saves / 31 shots)

4 April 2024	Red Eagles Hokkaido	5–0	HL Anyang	Anyang Ice Center	Recap
No scoring		First period	No scoring
Hayato Aiki (1) – 11:01; Yusuke Kon (1) – 12:51		Second period	No scoring
Seiji Takahashi (1) – ps – 8:51; Kenta Takagi (1) – en – 17:05; Yushi Nakayashiki (1) – pp – 18:58		Third period	No scoring
Yuta Narisawa (33 saves / 33 shots)		Goalie stats	Matt Dalton (17 saves / 22 shots)

6 April 2024	Red Eagles Hokkaido	1–5	HL Anyang	Anyang Ice Center	Recap
No scoring		First period	9:04 – Ahn Jin-hui (1)
Tsuguto Shibata (1) – 17:48		Second period	9:46 – pp – Shin Sang-hoon (1)
No scoring		Third period	13:03 – pp – Song Hyeong-cheol (1); 18:11 – en – Ahn Jin-hui (2); 19:47 – en – Lee Chong-min (1)
Yuta Narisawa (41 saves / 46 shots)		Goalie stats	Matt Dalton (22 saves / 23 shots)

Anyang won series 3–1

== Statistics ==
=== Scoring leaders ===
The following shows the top players who led the league in points, at the conclusion of matches played on 24 March 2024.

Player	Team	GP	G	A	Pts	+/–	PIM
(South Korea) Kim Sang-wook	HL Anyang	32	8	40	48	+3	16
(Japan) Seiji Takahashi	Red Eagles Hokkaido	32	25	22	47	+5	20
(Japan) Ryo Hashimoto	Red Eagles Hokkaido	32	3	44	47	+2	28
(Canada) Alexandre Boivin	Tohoku Free Blades	28	20	26	46	+2	12
(Japan) Shogo Nakajima	Red Eagles Hokkaido	32	16	29	45	+2	10
(South Korea) Lee Chong-min	HL Anyang	29	18	23	41	+5	14
(South Korea) Shin Sang-hoon	HL Anyang	32	16	18	34	+4	19
(United States) Alex Rauter	Yokohama Grits	32	11	20	31	+1	26
(Japan) Ryo Tanaka	Tohoku Free Blades	32	9	21	30	+2	14
(Japan) Makuru Furuhashi	Nikkō Ice Bucks	21	18	10	28	+1	13

=== Leading goaltenders ===
The following shows the top goaltenders who led the league in goals against average, provided that they have played at least 40% of their team's minutes, at the conclusion of matches played on 24 March 2024.

Player	Team	GP	TOI	GA	Sv%	GAA
(Japan) Takuto Onoda	Red Eagles Hokkaido	13	773:09	26	94.22	2.02
(Japan) Yuta Narisawa	Red Eagles Hokkaido	18	1071:26	43	92.11	2.41
(South Korea) Matt Dalton	HL Anyang	29	1753:19	71	91.57	2.43
(Japan) Takayuki Ito	Tohoku Free Blades	13	776:18	36	91.91	2.78
(Japan) Yutaka Fukufuji	Nikkō Ice Bucks	27	1481:23	81	90.17	3.28
(Japan) Michikazu Hata	Tohoku Free Blades	20	1123:59	65	89.60	3.47
(Japan) Shun Furukawa	Yokohama Grits	18	1044:40	73	88.63	4.19

== Awards ==
Award	Winner
League champions	HL Anyang
Most valuable player (playoffs)	Shin Sang-woo, HL Anyang
Most valuable player (regular season)	Lee Chong-min, HL Anyang
Best goaltender	Yuta Narisawa, Red Eagles Hokkaido
Rookie of the year	Riku Ishida, Tohoku Free Blades
Leading scorer (Regular season)	Seiji Takahashi, Red Eagles Hokkaido
Leading assists (Regular season)	Ryo Hashimoto, Red Eagles Hokkaido
Leading points (Regular season)	Kim Sang-wook, HL Anyang

=== Team of the year ===
First Team

- Yuta Narisawa (G) – Red Eagles Hokkaido
- Ryo Hashimoto (D) – Red Eagles Hokkaido
- Song Hyeong-cheol (D) – HL Anyang
- Alexandre Boivin (F) – Tohoku Free Blades
- Seiji Takahashi (F) – Red Eagles Hokkaido
- Shogo Nakajima (F) – Red Eagles Hokkaido
