= List of Olympic men's ice hockey players for South Korea =

The list of Olympic men's ice hockey players for South Korea consists of 22 skaters and 3 goaltenders. Men's ice hockey tournaments have been staged at the Olympic Games since 1920 (it was introduced at the 1920 Summer Olympics, and was permanently added to the Winter Olympic Games in 1924). South Korea participated for the first time at the 2018 Winter Olympics, which it hosted.

== Key ==
General terms
Term	Definition
GP	Games played
Ref(s)	Reference(s)

Goaltender statistical abbreviations
Abbreviation	Definition
W	Wins
L	Losses
T	Ties
Min	Minutes played
SO	Shutouts
GA	Goals against
GAA	Goals against average

Skater statistical abbreviations
Abbreviation	Definition
G	Goals
A	Assists
P	Points
PIM	Penalty minutes

== Goaltenders ==
Goaltenders
Player	GP	W	L	T	Min	SO	GA	GAA	Ref(s)
Matt Dalton	–	–	–	–	–	–	–	–	
Park Kye Hoon	–	–	–	–	–	–	–	–	
Park Sungje	–	–	–	–	–	–	–	–	

== Skaters ==
Skaters
Player	GP	G	A	P	PIM	Ref(s)
Ahn Jin Hui	–	–	–	–	–	
Cho Hyung Gon	–	–	–	–	–	
Cho Minho	–	–	–	–	–	
Jeon Jungwoo	–	–	–	–	–	
Kim Kisung	–	–	–	–	–	
Kim Sangwook	–	–	–	–	–	
Kim Wonjun	–	–	–	–	–	
Kim Won Jung	–	–	–	–	–	
Lee Don Ku	–	–	–	–	–	
Lee Young Jun	–	–	–	–	–	
Oh Hyonho	–	–	–	–	–	
Park Jin Kyu	–	–	–	–	–	
Park Woosang	–	–	–	–	–	
Alex Plante	–	–	–	–	–	
Brock Radunske	–	–	–	–	–	
Eric Regan	–	–	–	–	–	
Seo Yeongjun	–	–	–	–	–	
Shin Sanghoon	–	–	–	–	–	
Shin Sangwoo	–	–	–	–	–	
Michael Swift	–	–	–	–	–	
Mike Testwuide	–	–	–	–	–	
Bryan Young	–	–	–	–	–	

== See also ==
- South Korea men's national ice hockey team
