= 2025–26 Asia League Ice Hockey season =

2025–26 AL season
- League: Asia League Ice Hockey
- Sport: Ice hockey
- Duration: 6 September 2025 – 2 April 2026
- Games: 120
- Teams: 6

Regular season
- Regular season champion: Red Eagles Hokkaido
- Leaders Flag: Red Eagles Hokkaido
- Runners-up: HL Anyang
- Season MVP: Teruto Nakajima (Hokkaido)
- Top scorer: Makuru Furuhashi (Nikkō) (54 points)

Japan Cup

Finals

Asia League Ice Hockey seasons
- ← 2024–25 2026–27 →

The 2025–26 Asia League Ice Hockey season was the 23rd season of operation (21st season of play) of Asia League Ice Hockey (AL). The regular season began on 6 September 2025.

== League business ==
=== Teams ===
The same five teams from the 2024–25 season are joined by the newly formed Stars Kobe for the 2025–26 season.

Team	City/Town	Arena	Capacity	Previous season
HL Anyang	(South Korea) Anyang	Anyang Ice Arena	1,284	1st
Red Eagles Hokkaido	(Japan) Tomakomai	Hakucho Arena	3,015	2nd
Red Eagles Hokkaido	(Japan) Sapporo	Tsukisamu Gymnasium	2,321	2nd
Nikkō Ice Bucks	(Japan) Nikkō	Nikkō Kirifuri Ice Arena	1,608	3rd
Tohoku Free Blades	(Japan) Hachinohe	Flat Hachinohe	3,500	4th
Yokohama Grits	(Japan) Yokohama	KOSÉ Shin-Yokohama Skate Center	2,500	5th
Stars Kobe	(Japan) Kobe	Port Island Sports Center	3,000	Debut
Stars Kobe	(Japan) Amagasaki	Amagasaki Sports Forest	1,926	Debut

== Regular season ==
The regular season began on 6 September 2026 and ended on 15 March 2026.

=== Standings ===
Pos	Team	Pld	W	OTW	OTL	L	GF	GA	GD	Pts	Qualification
1	Red Eagles Hokkaido	40	30	3	2	5	168	90	+78	98	Regular season champions Qualification to playoffs
2	HL Anyang	40	24	3	4	9	136	102	+34	82	Qualification to playoffs
3	Nikkō IceBucks	40	22	3	6	9	149	96	+53	78	Qualification to playoffs
4	Tohoku Free Blades	40	16	4	0	20	119	121	−2	56	Qualification to playoffs
5	Yokohama Grits	40	9	5	2	24	113	155	−42	39	
6	Stars Kobe	40	1	0	4	35	70	191	−121	7	

Source: AL
Rules for classification: 1) Points; 2) Games won in regulation time; 3) Number of games won; 4) Head-to-head results, ranked by criteria 1 to 3; 5) Fewest regulation losses; 6) Away game results, ranked by criteria 1 to 3; 7) Goals scored; 8) Goal difference; 9) Fewest penalty minutes; 10) Drawing of lots.

== Awards ==
Award	Winner
Regular season champions	Red Eagles Hokkaido
Most valuable player (Finals)	TBD
Most valuable player (Regular season)	Teruto Nakajima (Red Eagles Hokkaido)
Best goaltender	Kazusa Otsuka (Nikkō Ice Bucks)
Rookie of the year	Yuto Taneichi (Yokohama Grits)
Leading scorer (Regular season)	Makuru Furuhashi (Nikkō Ice Bucks)
Leading assists (Regular season)	Shogo Nakajima (Red Eagles Hokkaido)
Leading points (Regular season)	Makuru Furuhashi (Nikkō Ice Bucks)

=== First team ===
Position	Best 6
G	Kazusa Otsuka, (Nikkō Ice Bucks)
D	Koki Yoneyama (Tohoku Free Blades)
D	Daisho Sato (Nikkō Ice Bucks)
F	Teruto Nakajima (Red Eagles Hokkaido)
F	Makuru Furuhashi (Nikkō Ice Bucks)
F	Boyvan Alexander (Tohoku Free Blades)
