= 2017 Channel One Cup =

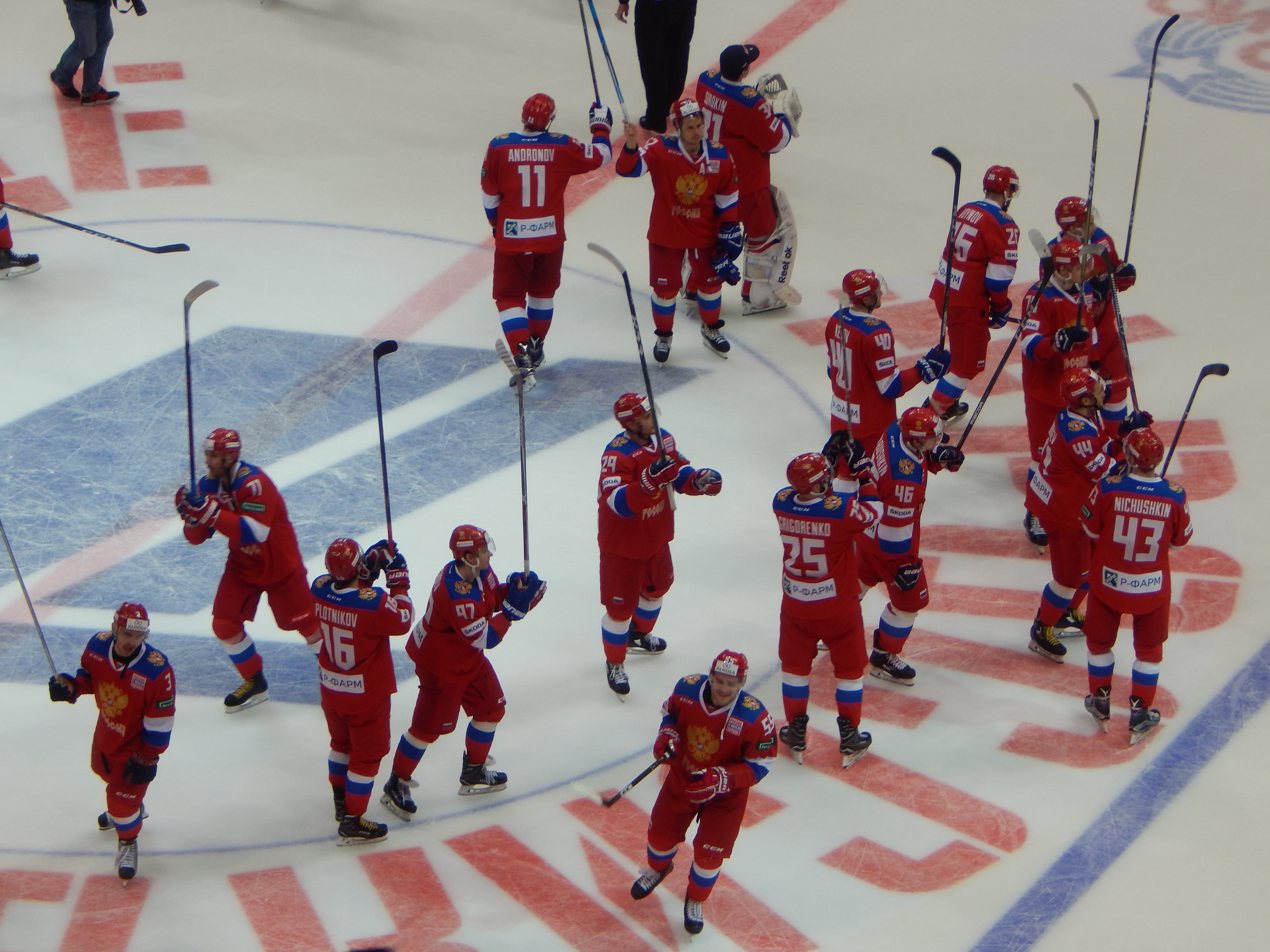
- Russia after defeating Canada, 2–0

Tournament details
- Host countries: Russia; Czechia
- Cities: Moscow; Prague
- Venues: 2 (in 2 host cities)
- Dates: 13–17 December 2017
- Teams: 6

Final positions
- Champions: Russia (16th title)
- Runners-up: Czech Republic
- Third place: Finland
- Fourth place: Sweden

Tournament statistics
- Games played: 9
- Goals scored: 38 (4.22 per game)
- Attendance: 83,496 (9,277 per game)
- Scoring leader: (Czech Republic) Martin Erat (5 points)

The 2017 Channel One Cup was the 50th edition of the tournament. It was played between 13 and 17 December 2017. The Czech Republic, Finland, Sweden and Russia with the new teams of Canada (composed of European-contracted players and dubbed the "Z team") and South Korea were involved in the tournament.

== Standings ==
Pos	Team	Pld	W	OTW	OTL	L	GF	GA	GD	Pts
1	Russia	3	3	0	0	0	8	1	+7	9
2	Czech Republic	3	2	1	0	0	11	4	+7	8
3	Finland	3	1	0	1	1	6	7	−1	4
4	Sweden	3	1	0	0	2	7	8	−1	3
5	Canada	3	1	0	0	2	5	8	−3	3
6	South Korea	3	0	0	0	3	4	13	−9	0

Source: Swehockey

== Games ==
All times are local. Moscow – (Moscow Time – UTC+3) Prague – (Central European Time – UTC+1)

13 December 2017; 18:30	Czech Republic	3–2 (OT) (0–2, 0–0, 2–0, 1–0)	Finland	O2 Arena, Prague; Attendance: 16,227

Game reference

Dominik Furch
Goalies
Mikko Koskinen
Referees:
(Sweden) Linus Öhlund
(Sweden) Markus Linde
Linesmen:
(Czech Republic) Tomáš Brejcha
(Czech Republic) Jiří Svoboda

	0–1	S. Manninen – 05:45
	0–2	J. Kemppainen (J. Junttila) – 19:09
M. Růžička (A. Nestrašil, M. Erat) (PP) – 52:15	1–2
M. Růžička (T. Mertl, M. Doudera) – 53:37	2–2
M. Růžička (M. Erat, O. Němec) (PP) – 61:04	3–2

10 min
Penalties
10 min
26
Shots
20

13 December 2017; 19:30	Canada	4–2 (1–2, 2–0, 1–0)	South Korea	VTB Ice Palace, Moscow; Attendance: 4,882

Game reference

Ben Scrivens
Goalies
Matt Dalton
Referees:
(Russia) Roman Gofman
(Russia) Konstantin Olenin
Linesmen:
(Russia) Nikita Shalagin
(Russia) Dmitry Shishlo

M. Frattin – 02:57	1–0
	1–1	Kim S. (Kim K.) – 05:01
	1–2	Kim S. (Kim K., M. Testwuide) – 17:44
M. Gragnani (M. Ellison, P. A. Parenteau) (PP) – 30:19	2–2
W. Wolski (D. Roy, M. Robinson) – 32:01	3–2
Q. Howden (ENG) – 59:28	4–2

2 min
Penalties
10 min
57
Shots
10

14 December 2017; 19:30	Sweden	1–3 (1–1, 0–1, 0–1)	Russia	VTB Ice Palace, Moscow; Attendance: 11,781

Game reference

Viktor Fasth
Goalies
Vasily Koshechkin
Referees:
(Finland) Anssi Salonen
(Finland) Aleksi Rantala
Linesmen:
(Russia) Gleb Lazarov
(Russia) Alexander Otmakhov

F. Pettersson (J. Lundqvist) – 09:24	1–0
	1–1	S. Kalinin (S. Voynov, V. Shipachev) – 12:52
	1–2	S. Voynov (S. Kalinin, S. Shirokov) – 34:13
	1–3	N. Gusev (PS) – 41:56

12 min
Penalties
6 min
23
Shots
38

15 December 2017; 15:00	Finland	4–1 (3–1, 0–0, 1–0)	South Korea	VTB Ice Palace, Moscow; Attendance: 2,418

Game reference

Karri Rämö
Goalies
Matt Dalton
Referees:
(Czech Republic) Pavel Hodek
(Czech Republic) Jan Hribik
Linesmen:
(Russia) Gleb Lazarov
(Russia) Alexander Otmakhov

	0–1	Kim K. (Kim S.) – 10:10
S. Manninen (J. Riikola, J. Lajunen) – 10:37	1–1
P. Kontiola (M. Anttila, J. Riikola) – 17:23	2–1
J. Jokipakka (M. Ruohomaa, J. Ikonen) – 18:31	3–1
J. Ikonen (M. Ruohomaa) – 41:14	4–1

18 min
Penalties
8 min
57
Shots
13

15 December 2017; 19:30	Czech Republic	4–1 (0–0, 1–1, 3–0)	Canada	VTB Ice Palace, Moscow; Attendance: 10,093

Game reference

Pavel Francouz
Goalies
Barry Brust
Referees:
(Russia) Roman Gofman
(Russia) Konstantin Olenin
Linesmen:
(Russia) Nikita Shalagin
(Russia) Dmitry Shishlo

	0–1	M. Ellison (B. Kozun, M. Gragnani) (PP) – 31:42
M. Řepík (V. Mozík) – 39:30	1–1
V. Mozík (A. Polášek, J. Kovář) (PP) – 46:53	2–1
M. Erat (J. Sekáč, O. Němec) (ENG) – 59:28	3–1
M. Řepík (ENG) – 59:56	4–1

6 min
Penalties
6 min
22
Shots
18

16 December 2017; 13:00	South Korea	1–5 (0–0, 1–3, 0–2)	Sweden	VTB Ice Palace, Moscow; Attendance: 4,064

Game reference

Matt Dalton
Goalies
Viktor Fasth, Magnus Hellberg
Referees:
(Russia) Denis Naumov
(Russia) Iurii Oskirko
Linesmen:
(Russia) Palei Yakov
(Russia) Alexander Sysuyev

Mike Testwuide (Kim K.) – 20:42	1–0
	1–1	A. Bergström (L. Omark, P. Hersley) – 23:39
	1–2	A. Lander (M. Wikstrand, M. Nygren) – 25:11
	1–3	P. Lindholm (J. Lindström) – 31:38
	1–4	D. Everberg (P. Zackrisson) (SH) – 49:07
	1–5	A. Engqvist (A. Bergström, L. Omark) (PP) – 56:24

26 min
Penalties
16 min
19
Shots
42

16 December 2017; 17:00	Russia	2–0 (0–0, 0–0, 2–0)	Canada	VTB Ice Palace, Moscow; Attendance: 12,680

Game reference
Vasily Koshechkin	Goalies	Ben Scrivens	Referees: (Czech Republic) Jan Hribik (Czech Republic) Pavel Hodek; Linesmen: (Russia) Gleb Lazarov (Russia) Alexander Otmakhov
N. Nesterov (N. Gusev, M. Grigorenko) (PP) – 42:24 / 1–0; S. Plotnikov (V. Gavrikov) – 49:23 / 2–0			Referees: (Czech Republic) Jan Hribik (Czech Republic) Pavel Hodek; Linesmen: (Russia) Gleb Lazarov (Russia) Alexander Otmakhov
33 min	Penalties	16 min	Referees: (Czech Republic) Jan Hribik (Czech Republic) Pavel Hodek; Linesmen: (Russia) Gleb Lazarov (Russia) Alexander Otmakhov
20	Shots	38	Referees: (Czech Republic) Jan Hribik (Czech Republic) Pavel Hodek; Linesmen: (Russia) Gleb Lazarov (Russia) Alexander Otmakhov

17 December 2017; 13:00	Sweden	1–4 (0–2, 0–0, 1–2)	Czech Republic	VTB Ice Palace, Moscow; Attendance: 8,870

Game reference

Magnus Hellberg
Goalies
Dominik Furch
Referees:
(Russia) Roman Gofman
(Russia) Konstantin Olenin
Linesmen:
(Russia) Palei Yakov
(Russia) Alexander Sysuyev

	0–1	V. Mozík (M. Vondrka, J. Kovář) – 12:18
	0–2	M. Řepík (V. Mozík, M. Vondrka) (PP) – 15:55
J. Lindström (P. Zackrisson, S. Kronwall) (PP) – 40:39	1–2
	1–3	M. Erat (J. Kovář, J. Kolář) – 54:25
	1–4	A. Nestrašil (P. Koukal, M. Erat) (ENG) – 57:56

31 min
Penalties
16 min
14
Shots
20

17 December 2017; 17:00	Russia	3–0 (2–0, 0–0, 1–0)	Finland	VTB Ice Palace, Moscow; Attendance: 12,481

Game reference

Ilya Sorokin
Goalies
Mikko Koskinen
Referees:
(Czech Republic) Martin Fraňo
(Czech Republic) Antonín Jeřábek
Linesmen:
(Russia) Nikita Shalagin
(Russia) Dmitry Shishlo

S. Andronov (A. Zub) – 08:06	1–0
M. Shalunov (N Gusev) – 12:19	2–0
V. Nichushkin (M. Grigorenko, E. Yakovlev) (ENG) – 59:43	3–0

6 min
Penalties
4 min
28
Shots
20

== Scoring leaders ==
Pos	Player	Country	GP	G	A	Pts	+/−	PIM	POS
1	Martin Erat	Czech Republic	3	2	3	5	+3	4	F
2	Vojtech Mozik	Czech Republic	3	2	2	4	+4	2	D
3	Ki Sung Kim	South Korea	3	1	3	4	+1	2	F
4	Michal Repik	Czech Republic	3	3	0	3	+2	4	F
5	Martin Ruzicka	Czech Republic	3	3	0	3	+1	0	F

GP = Games played; G = Goals; A = Assists; Pts = Points; +/− = Plus/minus; PIM = Penalties in minutes; POS = Position
Source: quanthockey

== Goaltending leaders ==
Pos	Player	Country	TOI	GA	GAA	Sv%	SO
1	Vasily Koshechkin	Russia	119:48	1	0.50	98.36	1
2	Dominik Furch	Czech Republic	121:04	3	1.49	93.18	0
3	Matthew Dalton	Switzerland	177:51	12	4.05	92.26	0
4	Viktor Fasth	Sweden	87:15	4	2.75	91.84	0
5	Mikko Koskinen	Finland	119:03	5	2.52	90.57	0
6	Magnus Hellberg	Sweden	87:13	3	2.06	90.32	0
7	Barry Brust	Canada	117:52	4	2.04	89.74	0

TOI = Time on ice (minutes:seconds); SA = Shots against; GA = Goals against; GAA = Goals Against Average; Sv% = Save percentage; SO = Shutouts
Source: swehockey
