= 2021 Japan Cup Ice Hockey (Asia League Ice Hockey) =

2020–21 Asia League Ice Hockey Season
- League: Asia League Ice Hockey
- Sport: Ice hockey
- Duration: 11 September 2021 – 27 March 2022
- Games: 12 -16 (first half),10-14 (second half)
- Teams: 5

Regular season
- Half Winners: Red Eagles Hokkaido (First half),Tohoku Free Blades(Second half)

Playoffs
- champions: Red Eagles Hokkaido

Asia League Ice Hockey seasons
- ← 2020–21 2022–23(Asia League Ice Hockey) →

The 2021-22 Asia league ice hockey was named the Japan cup 2021 as only Japanese Clubs participated due to COVID-19.

== Standings ==
=== First half ===
Pos	Team	Pld	W	OTW	OTL	L	GF	GA	GD	Pts	
1	Red Eagles Hokkaido	16	13	2	0	1	65	31	+34	43	Advanced to final
2	Nikkō IceBucks	12	7	0	1	4	52	35	+17	22	
3	East Hokkaido Cranes	14	5	2	2	5	42	41	+1	21	
4	Tohoku Free Blades	14	3	2	3	6	47	42	+5	16	
5	Yokohama Grits	16	1	1	1	13	29	86	−57	6	

Source: Japan Cup 2021 First half

=== Second half ===
Pos	Team	Pld	W	OTW	OTL	L	GF	GA	GD	Pts	
1	Tohoku Free Blades	14	8	2	0	4	51	40	+11	28	Advanced to final
2	Nikkō IceBucks	12	8	0	2	2	54	30	+24	26	
3	Red Eagles Hokkaido	10	7	0	0	3	45	24	+21	21	
4	East Hokkaido Cranes	12	3	2	0	7	44	44	0	13	
5	Yokohama Grits	12	0	0	2	10	15	71	−56	2	

Source: Japan Cup 2021 Second half

== Finals ==
The winners of two halves played a 5-game series in the final to determine the champion.

Final
H1	Red Eagles Hokkaido	3
H2	Tohoku Free Blades	0
