= 2020 Japan Cup hockey (Asia League Ice Hockey) =

2020–21 Asia League Ice Hockey Season
- League: Asia League Ice Hockey
- Sport: Ice hockey
- Duration: 1 October 2020 – 28 March 2021 (regular season)
- Games: 16-24
- Teams: 5

Regular season
- Leaders Flag: Red Eagles Hokkaido
- Top scorer: NAKAJIMA, Shogo (Red Eagles Hokkaido)

Asia League Ice Hockey Seasons seasons
- ← 2019–20(Asia League Ice Hockey) 2021–22 →

The 2020-21 Asia league ice hockey was named the Japan cup 2020 as only Japanese Clubs participated due to COVID-19.

== Standings ==
Pos	Team	Pld	W	OTW	OTL	L	GF	GA	GD	Pts	
1	Red Eagles Hokkaido	24	17	3	0	4	125	50	+75	57	Champion
2	East Hokkaido Cranes	20	11	0	5	4	62	50	+12	38	
3	Nikkō IceBucks	22	7	5	3	7	68	67	+1	34	
4	Tohoku Free Blades	22	6	3	2	11	65	91	−26	26	
5	Yokohama Grits	16	0	0	1	15	31	93	−62	1	

Source: Japan Cup 2020
