= Lee Don-ku =

South Korean ice hockey player

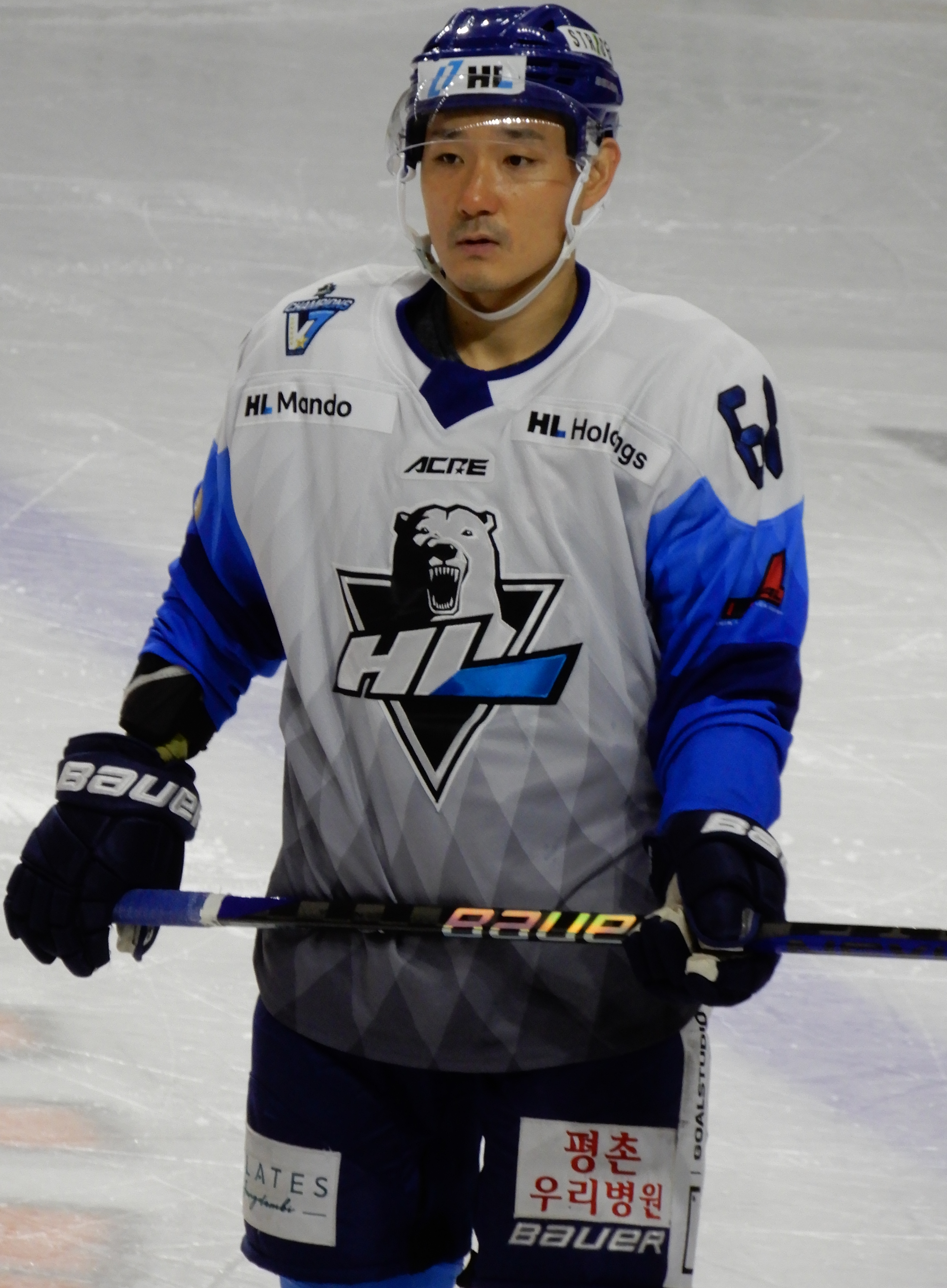
- Lee with the HL Anyang in 2023
- Born: February 7, 1988 (age 38) Seoul, South Korea
- Height: 5 ft 10 in (178 cm)
- Weight: 198 lb (90 kg; 14 st 2 lb)
- Position: Defenceman
- Shoots: Left
- ALH team: HL Anyang
- National team: South Korea
- Playing career: 2009–present

Lee Don-ku
Medal record

Men's ice hockey

Representing South Korea

Asian Games
Silver medal – second place	2017 Sapporo	Ice hockey
Bronze medal – third place	2011 Astana-Almaty	Ice hockey

Lee Don-ku (Korean: 이돈구 born February 7, 1988) is a South Korean professional ice hockey defenceman.

== Playing career ==
He is playing for HL Anyang of Asia League Ice Hockey. He previously played 4 years for Yonsei University.

== International play ==
He has been a member of the South Korean national ice hockey team since 2009. He played in the 2018 Winter Olympics.

== Career statistics ==
=== Regular season and playoffs ===
			Regular season					Playoffs
Season	Team	League	GP	G	A	Pts	PIM	GP	G	A	Pts	PIM
2009–10	Anyang Halla	ALIH	18	0	2	2	6	9	2	2	4	6
2010–11	Anyang Halla	ALIH	36	0	12	12	20	4	0	0	0	0
2011–12	Anyang Halla	ALIH	36	4	12	16	36	5	0	0	0	4
2012–13	Anyang Halla	ALIH	40	1	19	20	36	3	0	0	0	6
2013–14	Daemyung Sangmu	ALIH	42	7	28	35	68	3	0	0	0	18
2015–16	Anyang Halla	ALIH	48	7	19	26	40	8	0	2	2	0
2016–17	Anyang Halla	ALIH	40	4	13	17	50	6	0	3	3	0
2017–18	Anyang Halla	ALIH	24	4	6	10	29	8	1	4	5	4
2018–19	Anyang Halla	ALIH	34	4	7	11	20	4	0	0	0	4
2019–20	Anyang Halla	ALIH	36	5	15	20	32	3	0	0	0	6
2022–23	HL Anyang	ALIH	40	10	12	22	30	7	0	2	2	2
2023–24	HL Anyang	ALIH	31	6	9	15	6	4	0	1	1	2
2024–25	HL Anyang	ALIH	21	2	2	4	4	4	1	0	1	0
2025–26	HL Anyang	ALIH	40	5	14	19	18	6	1	2	3	0
ALIH totals			486	59	170	229	395	74	5	16	21	52

=== International ===
Year	Team	Event	GP	G	A	Pts	PIM
2005	South Korea U18	WJC-18 (D2)	5	4	5	9	8
2006	South Korea U18	WJC-18 (D1)	5	1	1	2	16
2007	South Korea U20	WJC-20 (D2)	5	1	4	5	6
2008	South Korea U20	WJC-20 (D2)	5	1	5	6	4
2009	South Korea	WC (D2)	5	1	3	4	4
2010	South Korea	WC (D1)	5	0	0	0	2
2011	South Korea	AWG	4	1	2	3	2
2011	South Korea	WC (D1)	4	2	0	2	4
2012	South Korea	WC (D1B)	5	3	3	6	2
2012	South Korea	OGQ	3	0	0	0	2
2013	South Korea	WC (D1A)	5	0	2	2	2
2014	South Korea	WC (D1A)	5	2	2	4	2
2015	South Korea	WC (D1B)	5	2	2	4	0
2016	South Korea	WC (D1A)	5	0	2	2	2
2017	South Korea	AWG	3	0	1	1	2
2017	South Korea	WC (D1A)	5	0	1	1	2
2018	South Korea	OG	4	0	0	0	2
2018	South Korea	WC	7	0	0	0	2
2019	South Korea	WC (D1A)	5	0	1	1	0
2021	South Korea	OGQ	3	0	0	0	2
2022	South Korea	WC (D1A)	4	0	0	0	0
2023	South Korea	WC (D1A)	5	0	2	2	2
2023	South Korea	OGQ	3	0	0	0	0
2024	South Korea	WC (D1A)	5	1	1	2	0
2026	South Korea	WC (D1B)	5	0	1	1	0
Junior totals			20	7	15	22	34
Senior totals			95	12	23	35	34
