= All Japan Ice hockey Championship =

Ice hockey competition

- Sport: Ice hockey
- Founded: 1930
- No. of teams: 16
- Country: Japan
- Most recent champion: H.C. Tochigi Nikkō Ice Bucks
- Most titles: Oji Eagles (36)
- Broadcaster: NHK
- Website: jihf.or.jp

The All Japan Ice hockey Championship (全日本アイスホッケー選手権大会) is an annual ice hockey tournament for Japanese teams, that began in 1930, making the tournament one of the oldest sporting competitions in the country.

The tournament, organized by the Japan Ice Hockey Federation, is an open competition for professional (Japan has four Asia League teams), amateur, and university teams from around the country (limited berths for each region). It is usually played during one week in February in a pre-designated city, with a single-elimination tournament.

== All Japan Ice Hockey champions ==
Year	Place	Winner
1930	Nikkō	Keio University
1931	Nagano	Manchukuo Medical University
1932	Hachinohe	Oji Seishi Tomakomai
1933	Nikkō	Waseda University
1934	Tōkyō	Keio University
1935	Tōkyō	Oji Seishi Tomakomai
1936	Tōkyō	Waseda University
1937	Tōkyō	Rikkyo University
1938	Sapporo	Waseda University
1939	Tōkyō	Rikkyo University
1940	Tōkyō	Meiji University
1941	Tōkyō	Meiji University
1942	Hachinohe	Kantō Team
1943	Gunma	Manchuria Team
1947	Hachinohe	Oji Seishi Tomakomai
1948	Morioka	Hachinohe White Bears
1950	Tomakomai	Oji Seishi Tomakomai
1951	Nikkō	Oji Seishi Tomakomai
1952	Tōkyō	Oji Seishi Tomakomai
1953	Nikkō	Furukawa Electric Tochigi
1954	Nikkō	Oji Seishi Tomakomai
1955	Ōsaka	Oji Seishi Tomakomai
1956	Nagoya	Oji Seishi Tomakomai
1957	Ōsaka	Iwakura Tomakomai & Oji Seishi Tomakomai
1958	Nagoya	Oji Seishi Tomakomai
1959	Nikkō, Tōkyō	Furukawa Electric Tochigi
1960	Fukuoka	Furukawa Electric Tochigi
1961	Tomakomai	Iwakura Tomakomai
1962	Nikkō	Furukawa Electric Tochigi
1963	Tōkyō	Iwakura Tomakomai
1964	Tōkyō	Oji Seishi Tomakomai
1965	Tōkyō	Iwakura Tomakomai
1966	Tomakomai	Oji Seishi Tomakomai
1967	Tōkyō	Iwakura Tomakomai
1968	Tōkyō	Oji Seishi Tomakomai
1969	Tōkyō	Oji Seishi Tomakomai
1970	Tōkyō	Seibu Tetsudo Tokyo
1971	Tōkyō	Seibu Tetsudo Tokyo
1972	Tōkyō	Seibu Tetsudo Tokyo
1973	Tōkyō	Oji Seishi Tomakomai
1974	Tōkyō	Seibu Tetsudo Tokyo
1975	Tōkyō	Kokudo Keikaku Tokyo
1976	Sapporo	Oji Seishi Tomakomai
1977	Tōkyō	Oji Seishi Tomakomai
1978	Tōkyō	Seibu Tetsudo Tokyo
1979	Tōkyō	Seibu Tetsudo Tokyo
1980	Tōkyō	Oji Seishi Tomakomai
1981	Tōkyō	Oji Seishi Tomakomai
1982	Tōkyō	Kokudo Keikaku Tokyo
1983	Tōkyō	Oji Seishi Tomakomai
1984	Tōkyō	Oji Seishi Tomakomai
1985	Tōkyō	Oji Seishi Tomakomai
1986	Tōkyō	Oji Seishi Tomakomai
1987	Tōkyō	Oji Seishi Tomakomai
1988	Tōkyō	Kokudo Keikaku Tokyo
1989	Tōkyō	Oji Seishi Tomakomai
1990	Tōkyō	Kokudo Keikaku Tokyo
1992	Tomakomai, Sapporo	Oji Seishi Tomakomai
1993	Tōkyō	Oji Seishi Tomakomai
1994	Sapporo	Shin Oji Tomakomai
1995	Tōkyō	Shin Oji Tomakomai
1996	Sapporo	Shin Oji Tomakomai
1997	Nagano	Kokudo Tokyo
1998	Tomakomai	Kokudo Tokyo
1999	Tōkyō	Kokudo Tokyo
2000	Tōkyō	Oji Seishi Tomakomai
2001	Sapporo	Seibu Tetsudo Tokyo
2002	Tōkyō	Oji Seishi Tomakomai
2003	Sapporo	Kokudo Tokyo
2004	Sapporo	Kokudo Tokyo
2005	Nagano	Oji Seishi Tomakomai
2006	Sapporo	Nippon Paper Cranes
2007	Hachinohe	Nippon Paper Cranes
2008	Kushiro	Seibu Prince Rabbits
2009	Tōkyō	Seibu Prince Rabbits
2010	Tomakomai	Nippon Paper Cranes
2011	Nikkō	Nippon Paper Cranes
2012	Hachinohe	Nippon Paper Cranes
2013	Yokohama	Oji Eagles
2014	Sapporo	Nippon Paper Cranes
2015	Yokohama	H.C. Tochigi Nikkō Ice Bucks
2016	Sapporo	Nippon Paper Cranes
2017	Nagano	Oji Eagles
2018	Tokyo	Tohoku Free Blades
2019	Tokyo	Oji Eagles
2020	Tokyo	H.C. Tochigi Nikkō Ice Bucks
2021	Hachinohe	East Hokkaido Cranes
2022	Nagano	East Hokkaido Cranes
2023	Nagano	Tohoku Free Blades
2024	Yokohama	H.C. Tochigi Nikkō Ice Bucks

== See also ==
- Asia League Ice Hockey
- Japan Ice Hockey League
- All-Japan Women's Ice Hockey Championship
