= Yutaka Fukufuji =

Japanese ice hockey player (born 1982)

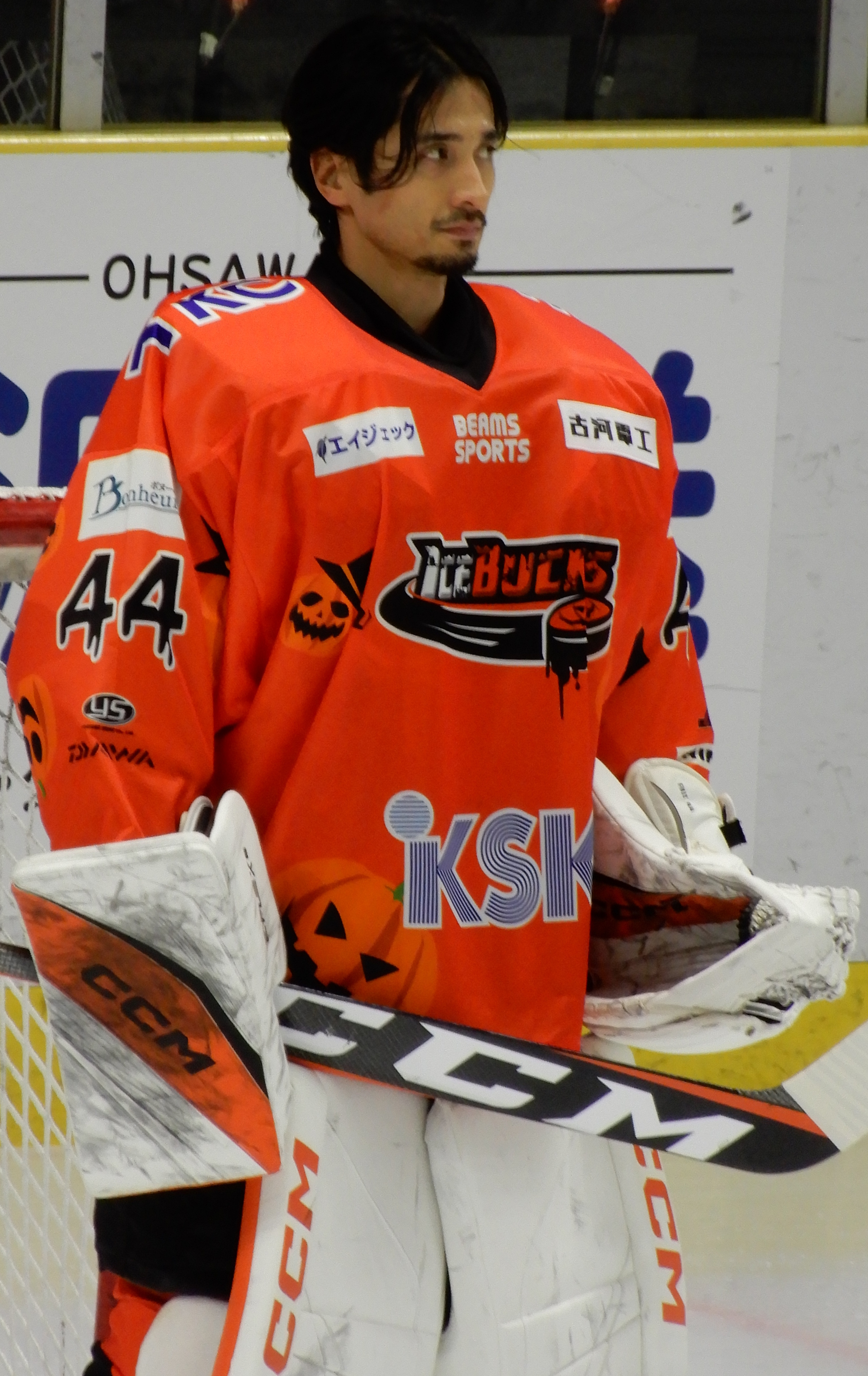
- Fukufuji in 2023 with the H.C. Tochigi Nikkō Ice Bucks
- Born: September 17, 1982 (age 43) Kushiro, Hokkaidō, Japan
- Height: 6 ft 1 in (185 cm)
- Weight: 173 lb (78 kg; 12 st 5 lb)
- Position: Goaltender
- Catches: Left
- ALIH team Former teams: Nikkō Ice Bucks; Los Angeles Kings; Kokudo Tokyo
- National team: Japan
- NHL draft: 238th overall, 2004; Los Angeles Kings
- Playing career: 2002–present

Medal record

Men's ice hockey

Representing Japan

Asian Games
Silver medal – second place	2011 Astana-Almaty	Ice hockey
Bronze medal – third place	2017 Sapporo	Ice hockey

Yutaka Fukufuji (福藤 豊, Fukufuji Yutaka; born September 17, 1982) is a Japanese ice hockey player for the Nikko Ice Bucks of the Asia League Ice Hockey. Fukufuji was the first Japanese player to appear in a National Hockey League (NHL) game, and played 4 games with the Los Angeles Kings during the 2006–07 season. The first Japanese draft pick, Hiroyuki Miura, was selected by the Montreal Canadiens in the 1992 NHL Draft, but never played in an NHL game. Fukufuji is the first Japanese citizen to be drafted as a goaltender in the NHL and second Japanese national to be drafted. Internationally Fukufuji has played for the Japanese national team at several World Championships.

== Career ==
Fukufuji was born in Kushiro, Hokkaidō, Japan. He played on the Kokudo hockey team of Asia League Ice Hockey in 2001. He was drafted by the Los Angeles Kings in the 2004 entry draft in the 8th round, 238th overall. He made his North American debut on February 7, 2003, with the ECHL Cincinnati Cyclones. He was voted the ECHL rookie of the month in January 2003. He played for the Bakersfield Condors of the ECHL in 2004–05 leading the team in wins, GAA, and shutouts. Fukufuji signed a two-year, entry-level contract with the Los Angeles Kings in August 2005. After starting the 2005–06 season with the Reading Royals, the Kings ECHL franchise, Yutaka was the number 2 goalie on the AHL Manchester Monarchs for a time.

On December 15, 2006, Fukufuji was called up on to the Los Angeles Kings on emergency basis. He became the first Japanese player to dress for an NHL game, but he did not play.

When goaltender Mathieu Garon was placed on injured reserve with a broken finger, Fukufuji was again recalled and flew in from Cleveland, Ohio to dress as backup to goalie Barry Brust. On January 13, 2007, Fukufuji made his first NHL appearance, the first by a Japanese player, when Kings head coach Marc Crawford decided to put him in to start the third period of a game against the St. Louis Blues. Fukufuji entered the game with the Kings trailing 5–4. He allowed one goal in the period, and the Kings also scored one goal while he was in net. The final score of the game was 6–5 in favor of St. Louis; as Fukufuji was the goaltender who allowed the decisive sixth St. Louis goal, he was assessed the loss.

On January 16, 2007, Fukufuji made history again when he became the first Japanese player to start in an NHL game, as he began the game in goal for the Kings against the Atlanta Thrashers. He allowed 3 goals on 9 shots and was pulled.

Fukufuji was not presented with a qualifying offer by the Kings before the 2007–08 season, but returned to the Condors on September 10, 2007, after signing a contract for the 2007–08 season.

On May 25, 2009, Fukufuji was signed by the Destil Trappers of the Eredivisie, the top league in the Netherlands. After one full season with Destil Trappers Fukufuji signed with Nikko Ice Bucks in July 2010.

On January 29, 2020, it was announced that Fukufuji had been selected to represent Japan in the third round of qualifiers for the 2022 Beijing Olympics.

== Career statistics ==
=== Regular season and playoffs ===
			Regular season										Playoffs
Season	Team	League	GP	W	L	T	OTL	MIN	GA	SO	GAA	SV%	GP	W	L	MIN	GA	SO	GAA	SV%
2001–02	Koduko	JIHL	14	—	—	—	—	715	42	—	2.94	.914	—	—	—	—	—	—	—	—
2002–03	Cincinnati Cyclones	ECHL	9	4	3	0	—	403	21	0	3.13	.915	—	—	—	—	—	—	—	—
2003–04	Koduko	JIHL	9	—	—	—	—	544	13	0	1.99	.918	—	—	—	—	—	—	—	—
2004–05	Bakersfield Condors	ECHL	44	27	9	5	—	2,517	104	3	2.48	.919	—	—	—	—	—	—	—	—
2005–06	Manchester Monarchs	AHL	2	1	1	—	0	120	6	0	3.00	.923	—	—	—	—	—	—	—	—
2005–06	Reading Royals	ECHL	29	15	9	—	4	1,691	82	1	2.91	.917	4	1	2	196	11	0	3.36	.888
2006–07	Los Angeles Kings	NHL	4	0	3	—	0	97	7	0	4.37	.837	—	—	—	—	—	—	—	—
2006–07	Manchester Monarchs	AHL	5	3	1	—	0	261	4	1	0.92	.965	1	0	0	1	0	0	0.00	1.000
2006–07	Reading Royals	ECHL	28	13	10	—	0	1,522	75	1	2.96	.905	—	—	—	—	—	—	—	—
2007–08	Bakersfield Condors	ECHL	46	18	18	—	1	2,427	137	1	3.39	.899	6	2	2	—	22	0	3.55	.912
2008–09	Bakersfield Condors	ECHL	35	18	12	—	1	1,821	100	0	3.29	.902	7	3	4	432	25	0	3.47	.905
2009–10	Tilburg Trappers	NED	30	—	—	—	—	1,086	60	0	3.43	—	11	—	—	652	36	0	3.31	—
2010–11	Nikkō Ice Bucks	ALIH	31	—	—	—	—	1,769	85	1	2.88	.922	—	—	—	—	—	—	—	—
2011–12	Nikkō Ice Bucks	ALIH	35	—	—	—	—	2,002	92	4	2.76	.930	5	—	—	277	14	1	3.03	.926
2012–13	Nikkō Ice Bucks	ALIH	30	—	—	—	—	1,793	92	4	2.54	.932	—	—	—	—	—	—	—	—
2013–14	Nikkō Ice Bucks	ALIH	37	—	—	—	—	2,107	93	—	2.65	.919	—	—	—	—	—	—	—	—
2014–15	Esbjerg Energy	DEN	34	—	—	—	—	—	—	—	3.04	.887	14	—	—	—	—	—	3.25	.886
2015–16	Nikkō Ice Bucks	ALIH	18	—	—	—	—	1,037	36	—	2.08	.933	2	—	—	80	8	—	6.00	.852
2016–17	Nikkō Ice Bucks	ALIH	22	—	—	—	—	1,276	43	—	2.02	.927	6	—	—	349	19	—	3.27	.914
2017–18	Nikkō Ice Bucks	ALIH	25	—	—	—	—	1,522	73	—	2.88	.909	3	—	—	179	7	—	2.38	.887
2018–19	Nikkō Ice Bucks	ALIH	20	—	—	—	—	1,132	51	1	2.70	.908	—	—	—	—	—	—	—	—
2019–20	Nikkō Ice Bucks	ALIH	24	—	—	—	—	1,334	68	0	2.41	.892	—	—	—	—	—	—	—	—
2022–23	Nikkō Ice Bucks	ALIH	13	8	5	—	0	782	27	3	2.07	.932	2	0	2	117	5	0	2.56	.918
2023–24	Nikkō Ice Bucks	ALIH	27	13	11	—	0	1,481	81	3	3.28	.902	—	—	—	—	—	—	—	—
NHL totals			4	0	3	—	0	97	7	0	4.37	.837	—	—	—	—	—	—	—	—

=== International ===
Year	Team	Event	GP	W	L	T	MIN	GA	SO	GAA	SV%
2000	Japan	U18-B	5	—	—	—	—	—	—	2.81	.909
2000	Japan	WJC-C	1	1	0	0	—	—	—	1.00	.933
2001	Japan	WJC-II	3	2	1	0	—	—	0	2.68	.915
2002	Japan	WC	5	0	3	2	299	18	0	3.61	.893
2010	Japan	WC-I	3	1	2	0	177	6	0	2.04	.939
2013	Japan	WC-IA	5	2	3	0	299	16	0	3.21	.905
2014	Japan	WC-IA	4	3	1	0	288	11	0	2.29	.924
2015	Japan	WC-IA	5	2	3	0	258	11	0	2.56	.901
2016	Japan	WC-IA	1	0	0	0	20	1	0	3.00	.667
2017	Japan	WC-IB	5	4	1	0	281	11	0	2.36	.921
2018	Japan	WC-IB	3	3	0	0	181	8	0	2.65	.877
Senior totals			31	15	13	2	1803	82	0	2.73	—
