= Shin Sang-hoon =

South Korean ice hockey player (born 1993)

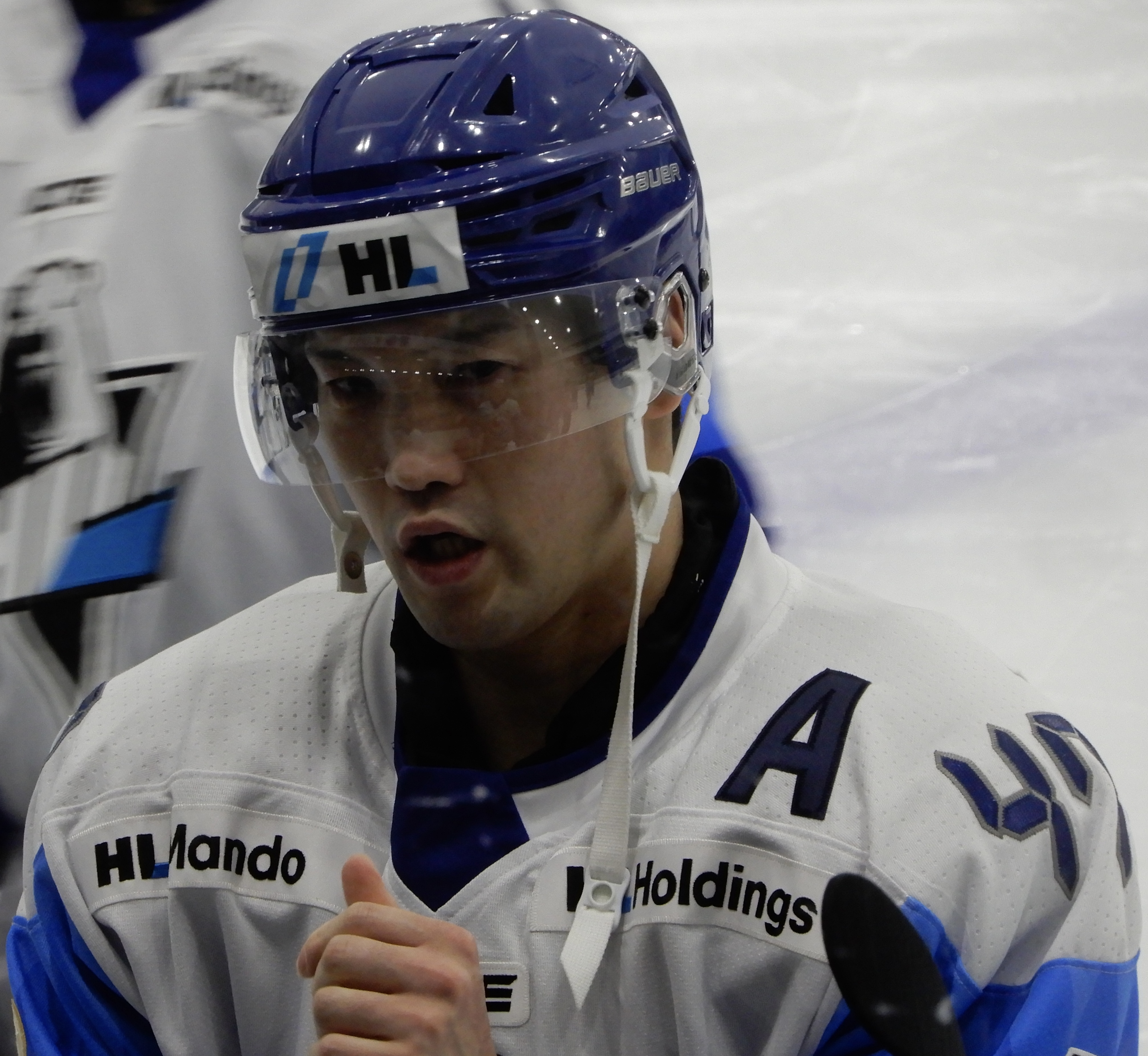
- Shin Sang-hoon in 2026
- Born: 1 August 1993 (age 32) Seoul, South Korea
- Height: 171 cm (5 ft 7 in)
- Weight: 76 kg (168 lb; 12 st 0 lb)
- Position: Forward
- Shoots: Right
- ECHL team Former teams: Norfolk Admirals; HL Anyang; Atlanta Gladiators
- National team: South Korea
- Playing career: 2013–present

Shin Sang-hoon (Korean: 신상훈; born 1 August 1993) is a South Korean ice hockey player currently playing for the Norfolk Admirals of the ECHL.

He competed in the 2018 Winter Olympics for the South Korea men's national ice hockey team.

== Playing career ==
Shin became the first Korean-born player to record points in an ECHL game on his debut for the Atlanta Gladiators on 6 February 2022.

After returning to HL Anyang for the 2023–24 Asia League season, Shin signed with the Norfolk Admirals for the 2024–25 ECHL season.

== Personal life ==
Shin has an older brother who is also a professional ice hockey player, Sang-woo.
