= Kushiro Ice Arena =

Ice sport arena in Kushiro, Hokkaido, Japan

Coordinates: 43.013262°N 144.360051°E

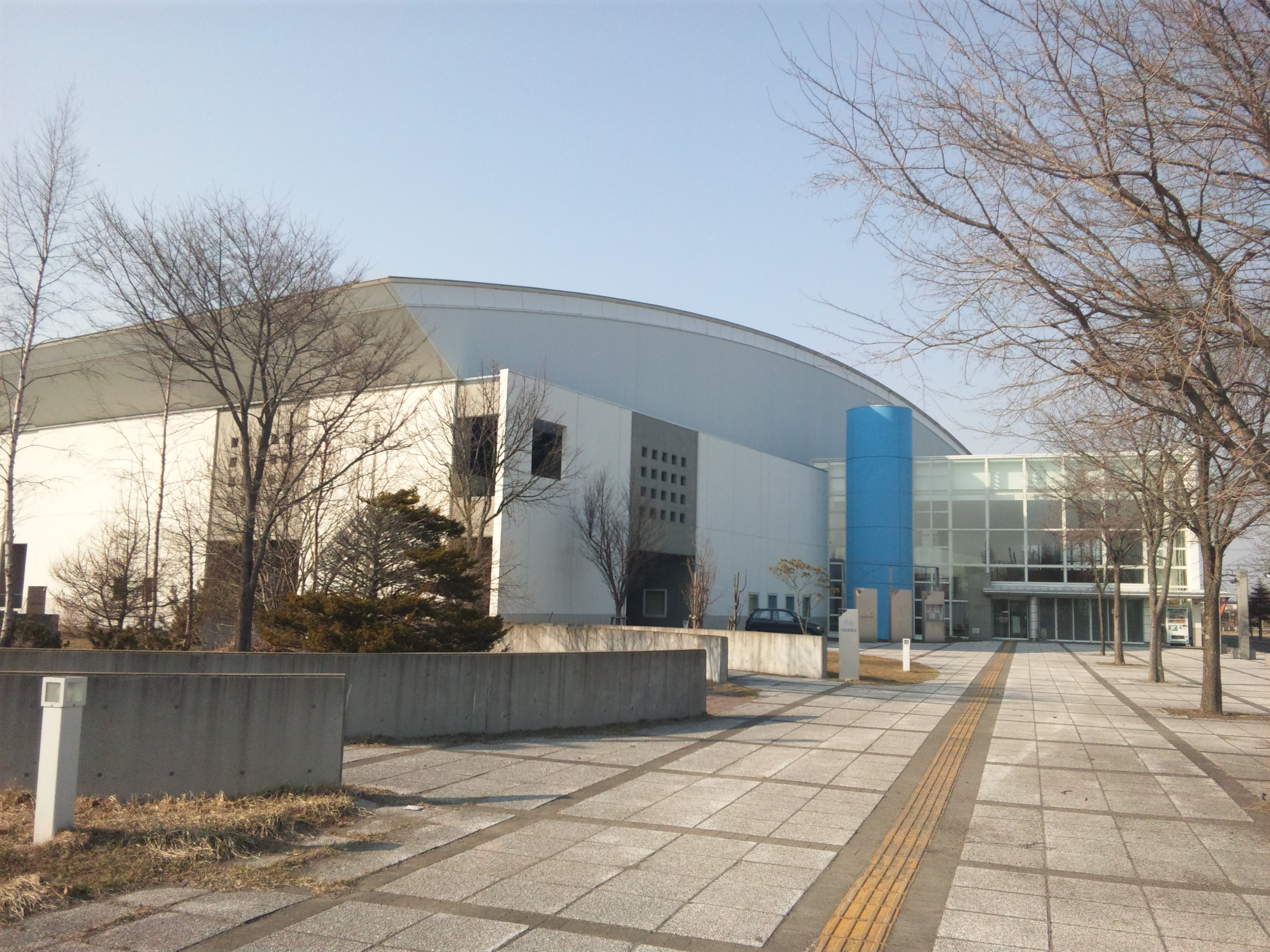
- Interactive map of Kushiro Ice Arena
- Location: Kushiro, Hokkaidō, Japan
- Owner: Kushiro City
- Operator: Kushiro City Sports Foundation
- Capacity: 2,539

Construction
- Opened: 1996

Tenants
- Nippon Paper Cranes (1997 - 2019); East Hokkaido Cranes (2019 - 2023)

The Kushiro Ice Arena (釧路アイスアリーナ) is an arena in the city of Kushiro, Hokkaidō, Japan. It is primarily used for ice hockey, and is the home arena of East Hokkaido Cranes of the Asia League Ice Hockey. The arena was formerly the home of the Nippon Paper Cranes, until their dissolution in 2019.

It was opened in 1996 and holds 2,539 seats, plus near 500 standing-room only. It is located near Japan National Route 38, close to the Nippon Paper plant, which is the former owner of the Paper Cranes.
