= Lee Young-jun (ice hockey) =

South Korean ice hockey player

- Born: 3 January 1991 (age 34); South Korea
- Height: 184 cm (6 ft 0 in)
- Weight: 75 kg (165 lb; 11 st 11 lb)
- Position: Centre
- Shoots: Right
- team Former teams: Free agent Anyang Halla; High1; Daemyung Sangmu; Daemyung Killer Whales
- National team: South Korea
- Playing career: 2012–present

Lee Young-jun (born 3 January 1991) is a South Korean ice hockey centre. Lee is currently a free agent having last played for the Daemyung Killer Whales of Asia League Ice Hockey (ALIH). He also played for Anyang Halla, High1 and Daemyung Sangmu.

He competed in the 2018 Winter Olympics for the South Korea national team.
