= Kim Ki-sung =

South Korean ice hockey player

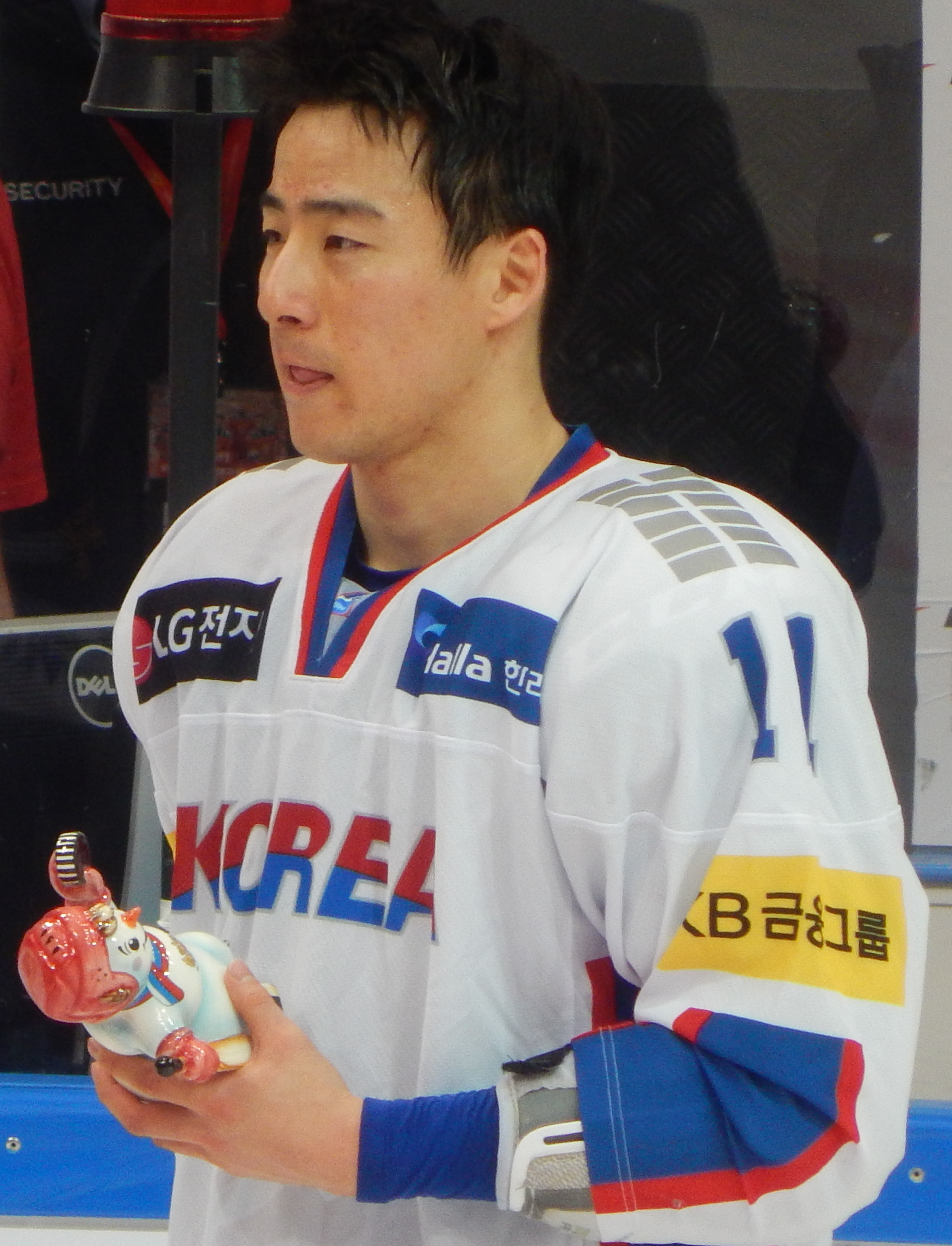
- Kim is awarded a best player of the game prize at the Channel One Cup (2017)
- Born: May 14, 1985 (age 39); Seoul, South Korea
- Height: 5 ft 10 in (178 cm)
- Weight: 184 lb (83 kg; 13 st 2 lb)
- Position: Left wing
- Shoots: Left
- team Former teams: Free agent Tulsa Oilers; HCK; Daemyung Sangmu; Anyang Halla
- National team: South Korea
- Playing career: 2005–present

Kim Ki-sung
Medal record

Men's ice hockey

Representing South Korea

Asian Games
Bronze medal – third place	2007 Changchun	Ice hockey
Bronze medal – third place	2011 Astana-Almaty	Ice hockey

Kim Ki-sung (Korean: 김기성 born May 14, 1985) is a South Korean professional ice hockey left winger. He is currently a free agent having last played for Anyang Halla of Asia League Ice Hockey (ALIH). Ki-sung was voted the "Young guy of the year "(Rookie of the year) in his first season in Asia League Ice Hockey.
