= Seiji Takahashi =

Japanese ice hockey player

- Born: February 24, 1993 (age 33) Tomakomai, Japan
- Height: 5 ft 8 in (173 cm)
- Weight: 172 lb (78 kg; 12 st 4 lb)
- Position: Forward
- Shoots: Right
- ALIH team: Oji Eagles
- National team: Japan
- Playing career: 2011–present

Seiji Takahashi (高橋聖二), born February 24, 1993, is a Japanese professional ice hockey forward currently playing for the Oji Eagles of the Asia League.

Since 2011 he plays for the Oji Eagles. He also plays in the senior Japan national team since 2012.
