= Ahn Jin-hui =

South Korean ice hockey player (born 1991)

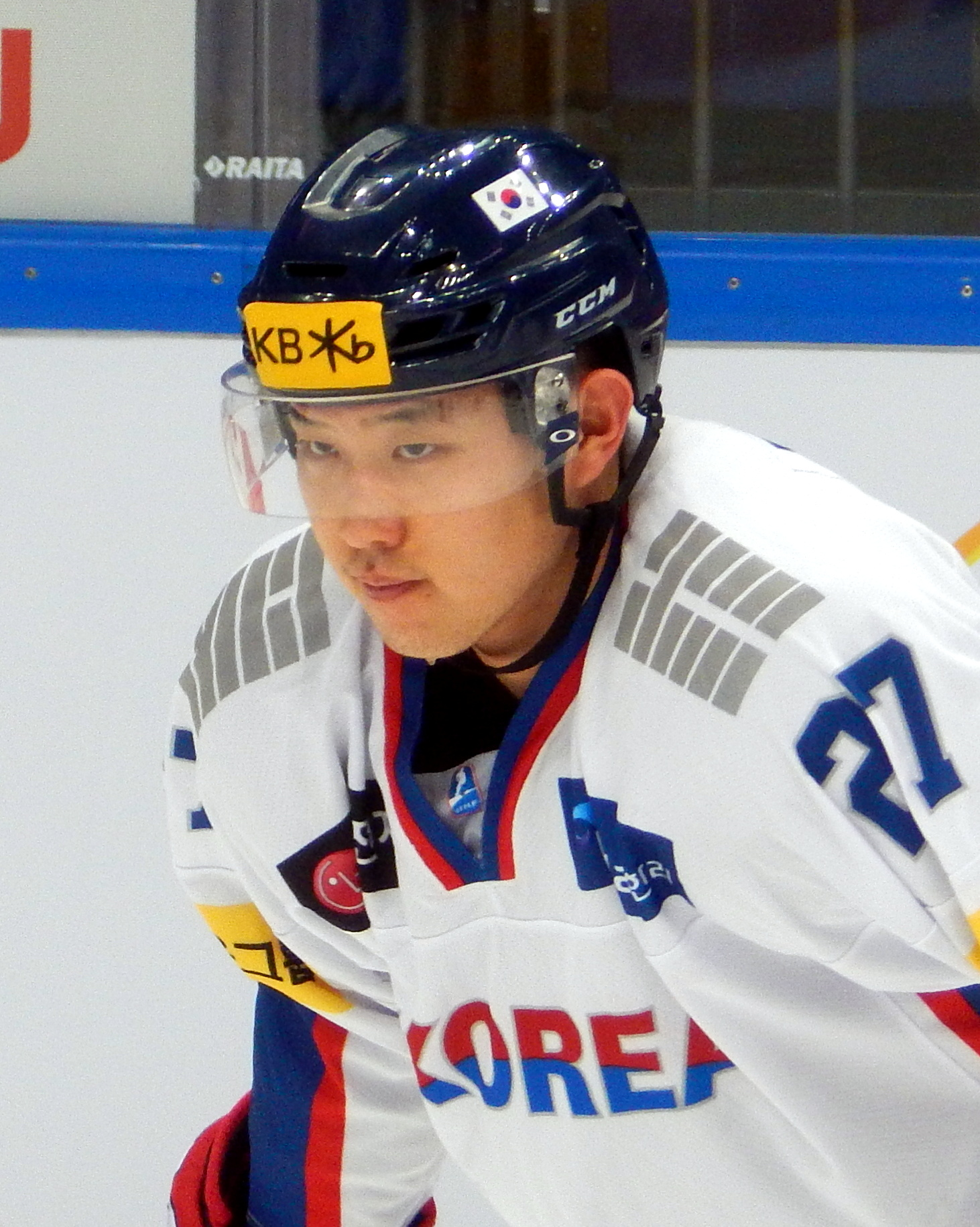
- Born: 6 March 1991 (age 35) Seoul, South Korea
- Height: 181 cm (5 ft 11 in)
- Weight: 84 kg (185 lb; 13 st 3 lb)
- Position: Right wing
- Shoots: Right
- ALIH team Former teams: Anyang Halla; Daemyung Sangmu
- National team: South Korea
- Playing career: 2013–present

Medal record

Ice hockey

Representing South Korea

Asian Winter Games
Bronze medal – third place	2025 Harbin	Ice hockey

Ahn Jin-hui (born 6 March 1991) is a South Korean ice hockey player currently playing for Anyang Halla of Asia League Ice Hockey. He competed in the 2018 Winter Olympics.
