= Hakucho Arena =

Sporting arena in Tomakomai, Hokkaido, Japan

Coordinates: 42.639342°N 141.606589°E

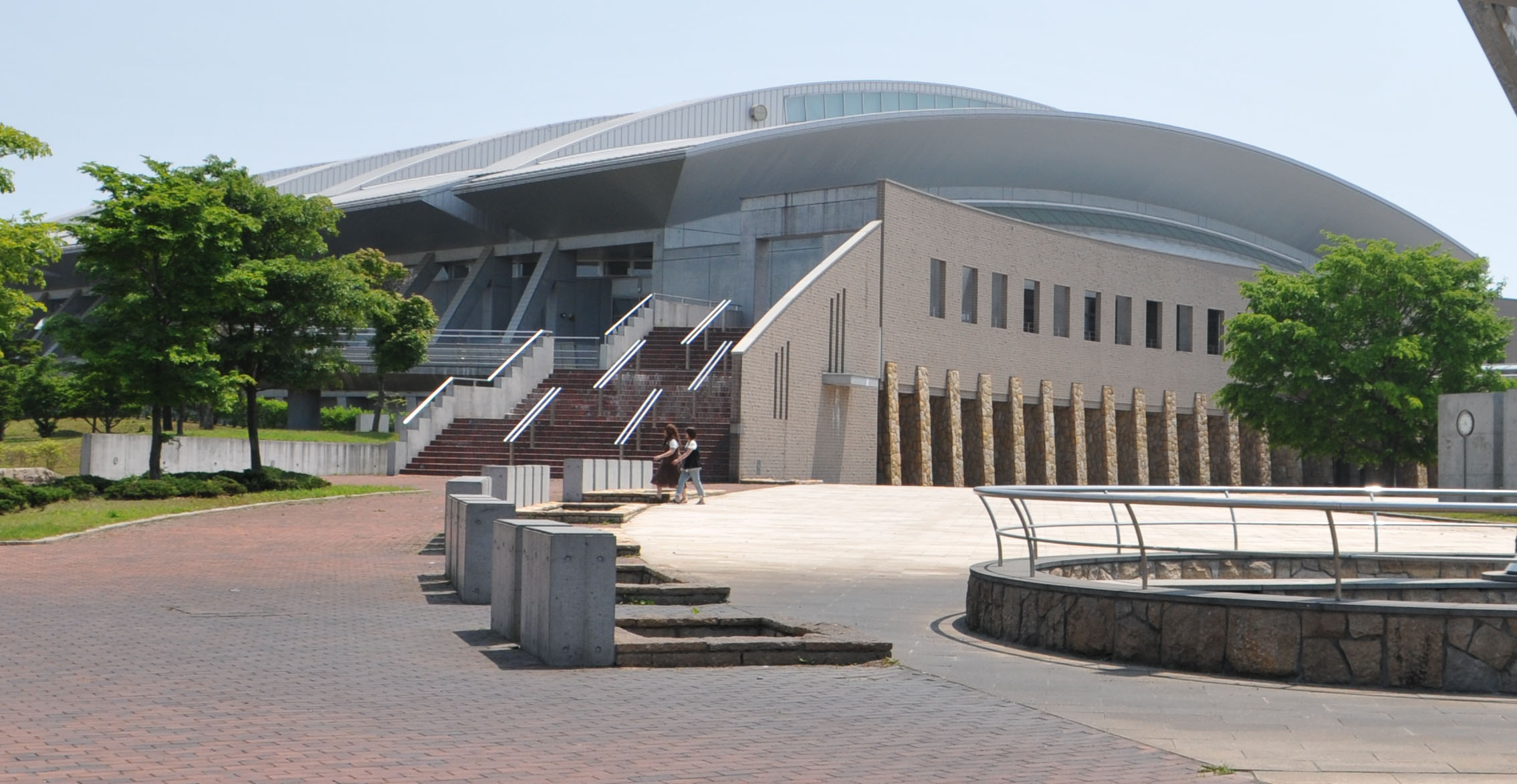
- Interactive map of Hakucho Arena
- Location: Tomakomai, Hokkaidō, Japan
- Owner: Tomakomai City
- Operator: Tomakomai City Athletic Association
- Capacity: 3,015

Construction
- Opened: 1996

Tenant
- Oji Eagles

The Hakucho Arena (白鳥アリーナ, Hakuchō Arīna) is an indoor sporting arena located in Tomakomai, Hokkaidō, Japan. The arena opened in 1996. It has a capacity of 4,015 (3,015 seated and 1,000 standing). It is the home arena of the Oji Eagles ice hockey team.

Many tournaments such as the Asia League Ice Hockey and national high school competitions are held here.

== History ==
The arena cost about 5.1 billion yen and was completed in 1996, the 30th anniversary of the Tomakomai City's declaration as a "Sports City".

At the opening ceremony, members of the Tomakomai Figure Skating Club and local sports clubs cut the ribbon, and there was a performance by Midori Ito. The Oji Paper Ice Hockey Team played a game with a Russian team.

It has been designated as a national training center for ice hockey since 2008.

In April 2015, the holding company of Oji Paper Prince Holdings changed the name of the arena to "Swan Prince Ice Arena".

== Notes ==
Since April 2015, this arena is called "Hakucho Oji Ice Arena" by the introduction of naming rights.
