= KOSÉ Shin-Yokohama Skate Center =

Indoor sporting arena in Japan

Coordinates: 35°30′27.9288″N 139°36′45.0864″E

Kosé Shin Yokohama Skate Center
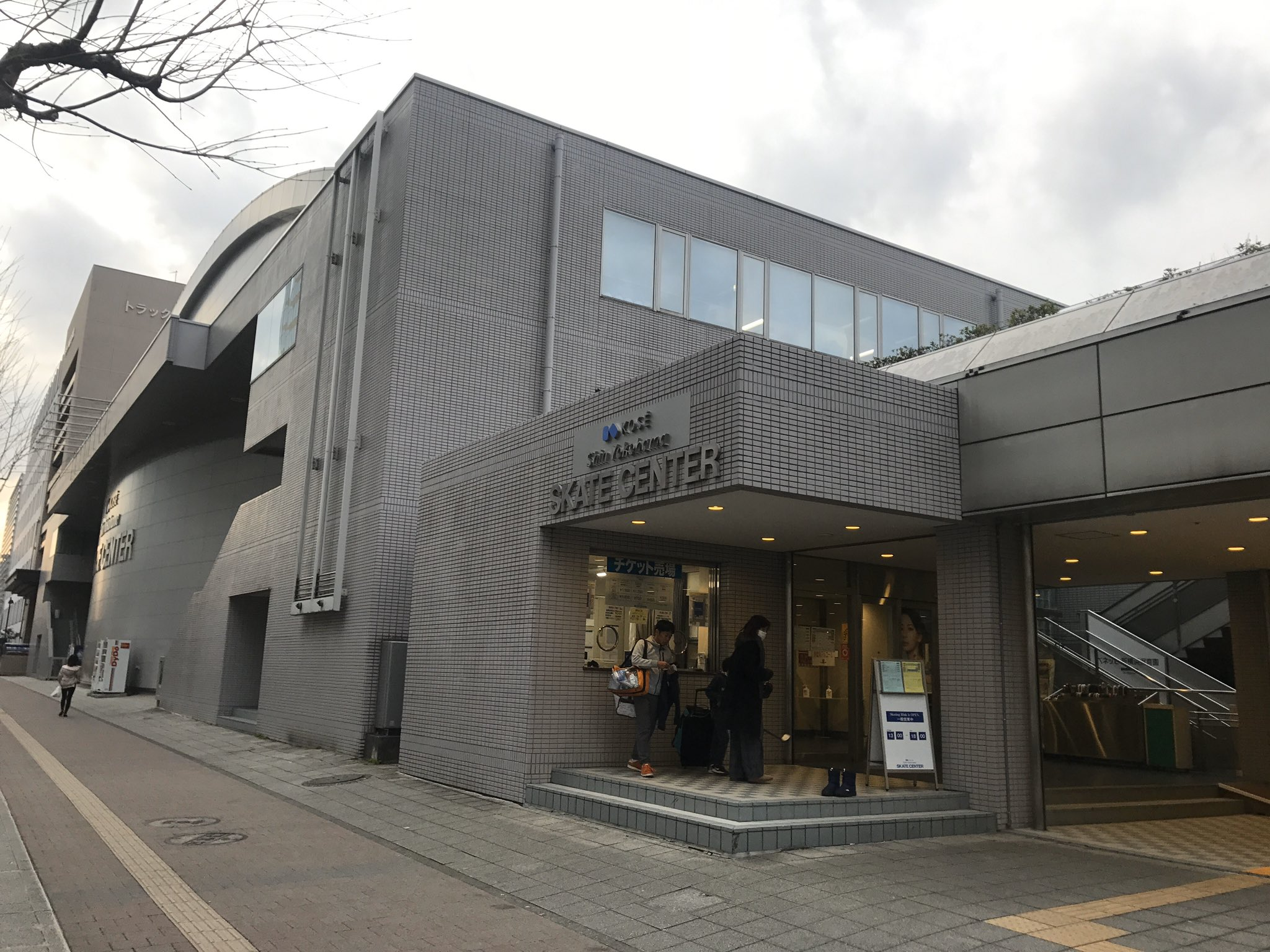
- Interactive map of Kosé Shin Yokohama Skate Center
- Location: Yokohama, Japan
- Owner: Shin Yokohama Prince Hotel
- Capacity: 1,406

Construction
- Opened: 1990

Tenant
- Yokohama Grits

The Kosé Shin Yokohama Skate Center (KOSÉ新横浜スケートセンター) is an indoor sporting arena located in Yokohama, Kanagawa, Japan. The arena opened in 1990. It has a total capacity of 2,500 people (1,406 seated and 1,094 standing). It is the home ice of the Asia League Ice Hockey team Yokohama Grits.

In addition to ice hockey games, it can accommodate ice skating events and leisure skating throughout the year.

The Tokyo based cosmetics Corporation, Kosé, acquired the naming right of the arena, originally named Shin Yokohama Skate Center, in 2017.

The arena is located around five minutes' walk from Shin-Yokohama Station, a station on the Yokohama Line.
