= Anyang Sports Complex =

Football stadium in Anyang

Coordinates: 37°24′19″N 126°56′48″E

Anyang Stadium
- 안양종합운동장 주경기장
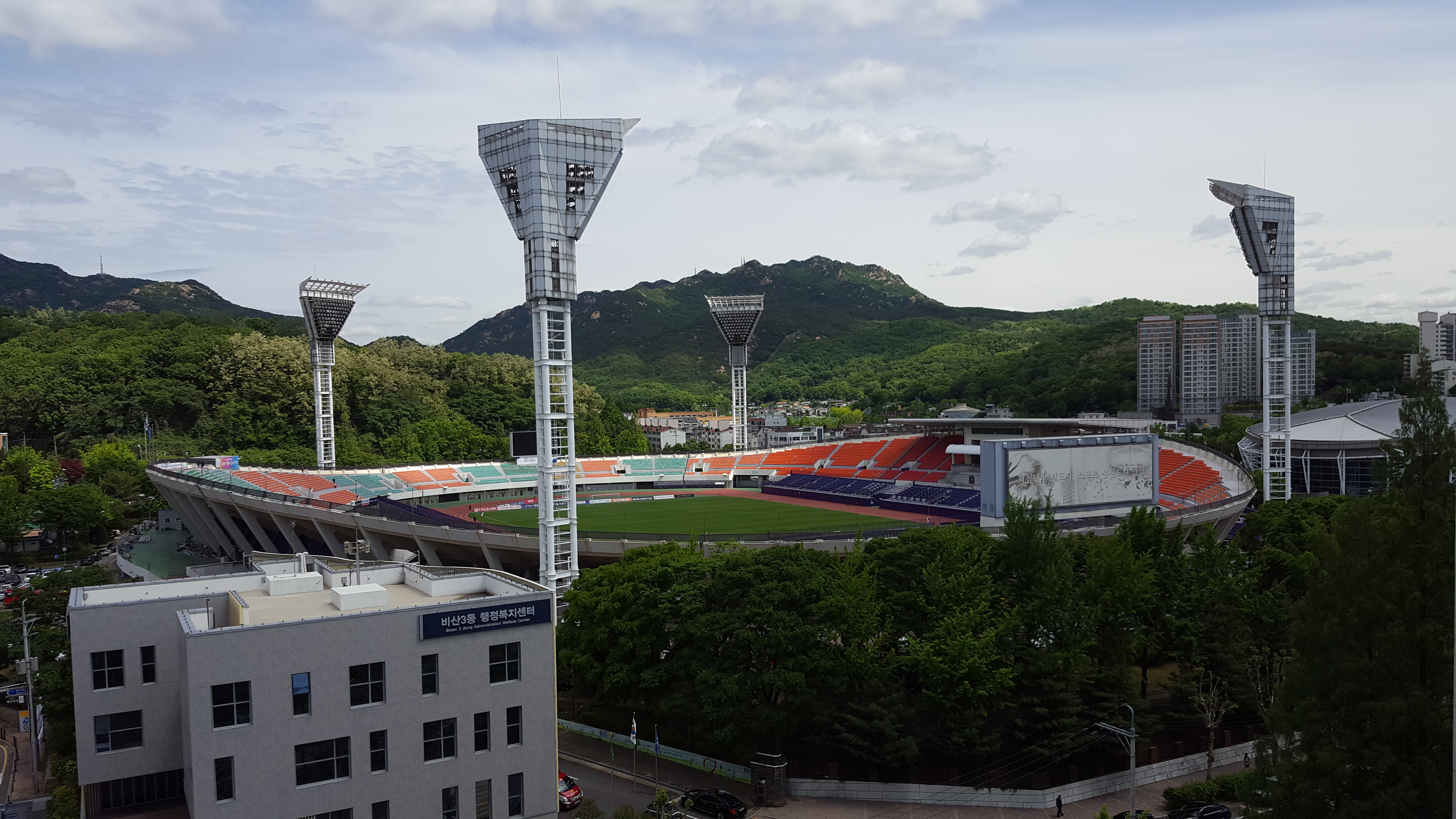
- Anyang Stadium in 2020
- Interactive map of Anyang Stadium
- Location: 1023, Bisan3-dong, Dongan District, Anyang, Gyeonggi, South Korea
- Owner: Anyang City Hall
- Operator: Anyang Urban Corporation
- Capacity: 17,143
- Surface: Grass
- Field size: 105 by 75 metres (115 by 82 yards)

Construction
- Opened: 30 June 1986

Tenants
- Yukong Elephants (1987–1990); Anyang LG Cheetahs (1996–2003); FC Anyang (2013–present)

Anyang Sports Complex (Korean: 안양종합운동장) is a group of sports facilities in Anyang, Gyeonggi, South Korea. The complex consists of Anyang Stadium, Anyang Gymnasium, a swimming pool, an ice rink, a tennis court, and an auxiliary stadium.

== Anyang Stadium ==
It is a multi-purpose stadium and currently used mostly for football matches and was the home stadium of Anyang LG Cheetahs before they relocated to Seoul. It is now used by FC Anyang. The stadium holds 17,143 people and opened in 1986.

== Anyang Gymnasium ==
As part of the greater stadium complex, it also features an indoor arena with a capacity for 6,690 spectators. The arena was built in 2000 and is home of the Korean Basketball League team Anyang Jung Kwan Jang Red Boosters.

== Anyang Ice Arena ==
The Anyang Ice Arena in 2018

Anyang Ice Arena (also known as Anyang Ice Rink) has been the home of the Asia League Ice Hockey team HL Anyang since 2004. The arena has a capacity for 1,284 spectators.
