= Matt Dalton =

Canadian-South Korean ice hockey player

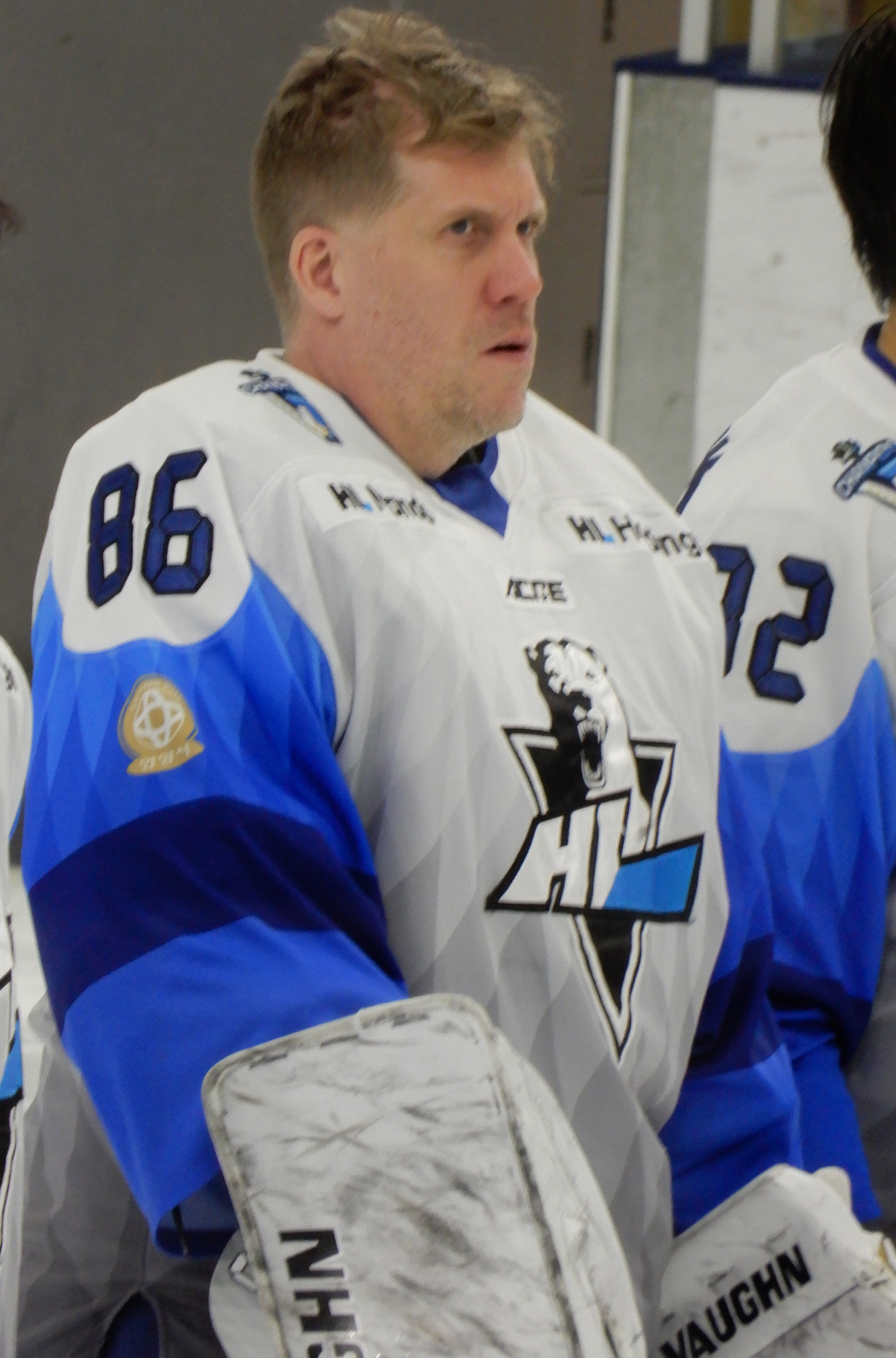
- Dalton with the HL Anyang in 2023
- Born: July 4, 1986 (age 40) Clinton, Ontario, Canada
- Height: 6 ft 1 in (185 cm)
- Weight: 189 lb (86 kg; 13 st 7 lb)
- Position: Goaltender
- Caught: Left
- ALH team Former teams: HL Anyang; Providence Bruins; Reading Royals; Vityaz Chekhov
- National team: South Korea
- NHL draft: Undrafted
- Playing career: 2009–2025

Matt Dalton (born July 4, 1986) is a Korean-Canadian professional ice hockey goaltender for HL Anyang of the Asia League Ice Hockey (ALIH) and the South Korea men's national ice hockey team.

== Career ==
Dalton played college hockey at Bemidji State University. On April 22, 2009, he was signed as a free agent by the Boston Bruins.

Dalton made his Kontinental Hockey League (KHL) debut with Vityaz Chekhov on August 14, 2011, and allowed one goal in a 3–1 win over Metallurg Novokuznetsk. Dalton played in the KB Euro Ice Hockey Challenge as the starting goaltender for the South Korean national team.

== Awards and honours ==
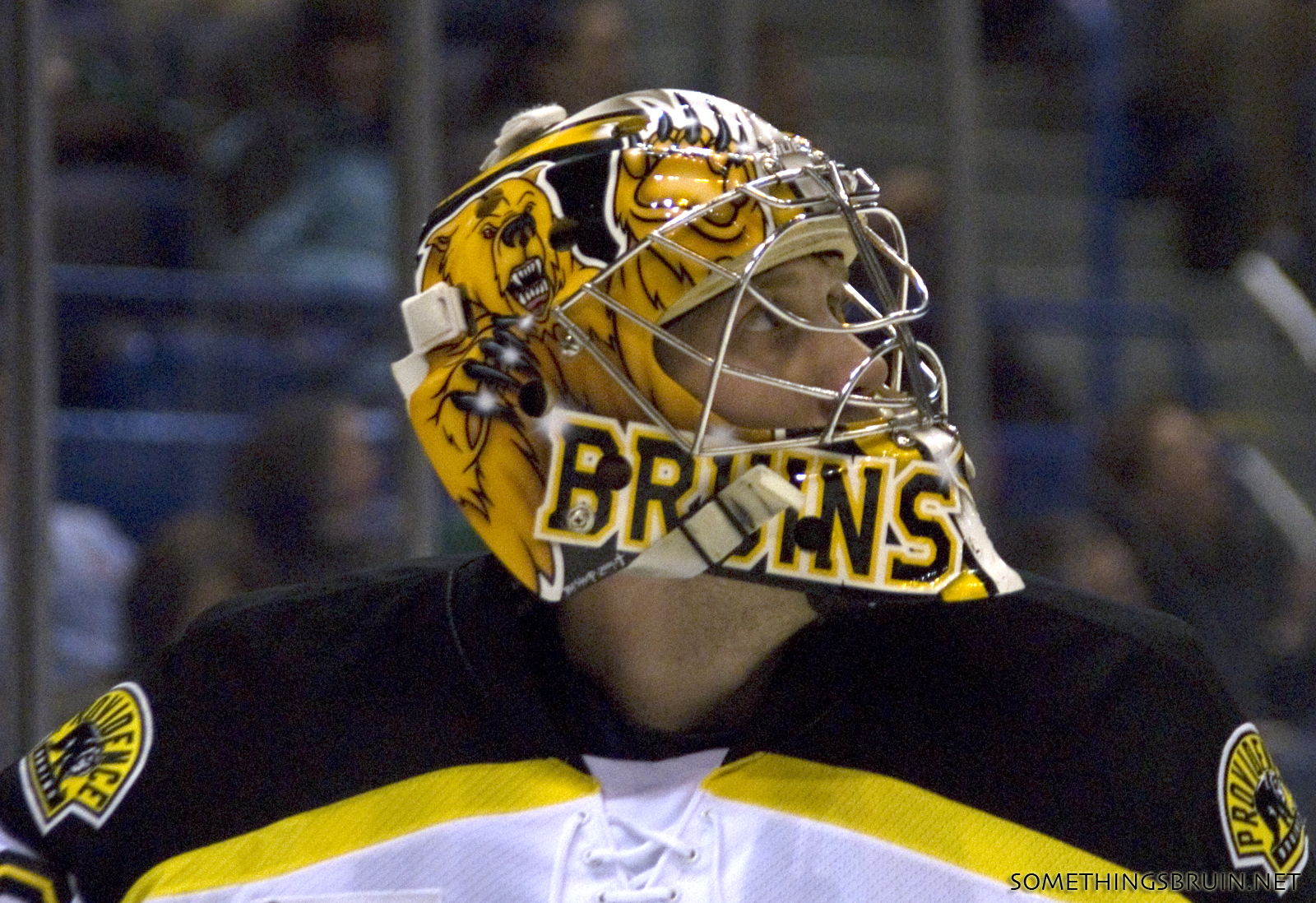
Dalton with the Providence Bruins in 2011.

=== Junior ===
- NAHL Most Valuable Player – 2005–06
- NAHL First All-Star Team – 2005–06
- NAHL All-Rookie First Team – 2005–06
- NAHL Best GAA (1.63) – 2005–06
- NAHL Best Save Percentage (.940) – 2005–06

=== College ===
- CHA champion – 2008–09
- All-CHA Second Team – 2008–09
- NCAA (CHA) All-Tournament Team – 2008–09
- NCAA (CHA) Second All-Star Team – 2008–09

=== Professional ===
- ECHL Goaltender of the Week – February 14, 2011 – February 20, 2011
- Nadezhda Cup Best Goaltender – 2013–14
- Asia League Ice Hockey (ALIH) champion – 2015–16, 2016–17, 2017–18, 2022–23
- ALIH Best Goaltender – 2014–15, 2016–17, 2017–18
- ALIH First Team – 2014–15, 2016–17, 2017–18
- ALIH Playoff MVP – 2015–16, 2016–17

=== International ===
- IIHF World Championship Division I Group A silver medal – 2017
- IIHF World Championship Division I Group A bronze medal – 2019
- IIHF World Championship Division I Group A Best Goaltender – 2019
- IIHF World Championship Division I Group A All-Star team – 2019
