= East Hokkaido Cranes =

Professional ice hockey team, Kushiro, Japan

- City: Kushiro, Hokkaidō
- Founded: 2019; 7 years ago
- Folded: 2023; 3 years ago
- Home arena: Kushiro Ice Arena
- Colours: Black, red, white
- Website: cranes.team

The East Hokkaido Cranes (Japanese: ひがし北海道クレインズ Higashi Hokkaidō kureinzu) were a professional ice hockey team based in Kushiro, Japan. They played their home games at the Kushiro Ice Arena.

== History ==
The East Hokkaido Cranes formed in April 2019, as a phoenix club following the demise of the Nippon Paper Cranes franchise. The Paper Cranes had previously existed for 70 years; however, their owners, Nippon Paper Industries, announced in December 2018 that the team would be put up for sale as a result of corporate streamlining and declining revenues. No buyer was found, and as a result the team folded.

The East Hokkaido Ice Hockey Club LLC, led by Tanaka Shigeki, announced that they had secured ¥125 million of founding, enabling the establishment of the new team. Asia League Ice Hockey chairman Sumio Kobayashi announced on 23 April 2019 that the new franchise would join the league, replacing the Paper Cranes, whilst retaining 15 players.

The Cranes played their first regular season game on 31 August 2019, losing 3–2 to the Nikkō Ice Bucks, with forward Taiga Irikura scoring the first goal in franchise history.

== Honours ==
- All Japan Championship:
  - Winners (2): 2020, 2021
