= Nikkō Kirifuri Ice Arena =

Indoor arena in Nikkō, Tochigi, Japan

Coordinates: 36.7607795°N 139.6100736°E

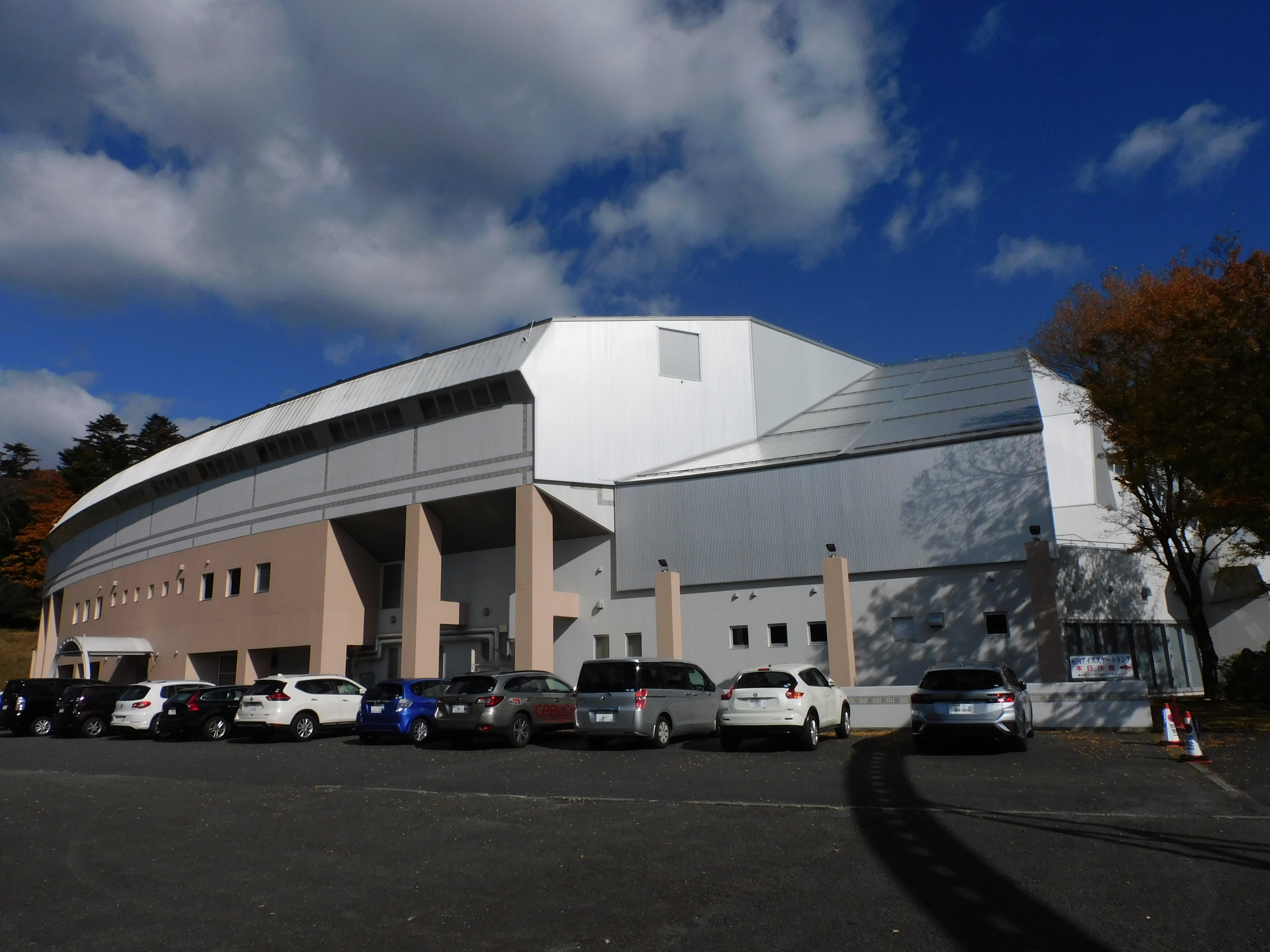
- Interactive map of Nikkō Kirifuri Ice Arena
- Location: Nikkō, Tochigi, Japan
- Owner: Tochigi Prefecture
- Operator: Nikko City
- Capacity: 1,608

Construction
- Opened: 1992

Tenant
- Nikkō Ice Bucks

The Nikkō Kirifuri Ice Arena (日光霧降アイスアリーナ) is an indoor sporting arena in the city of Nikkō, Tochigi, Japan. It is primarily used for ice hockey, and is the home arena of Nikkō Ice Bucks of the Asia League Ice Hockey.

It was opened in 1992 and holds 2,000 seats (1,608 seated and 392 standing only).
