= Flat Hachinohe =

Ice hockey venue in Aomori, Japan

Coordinates: 40°30′41.4″N 141°25′40.4″E

- フラットアリーナ

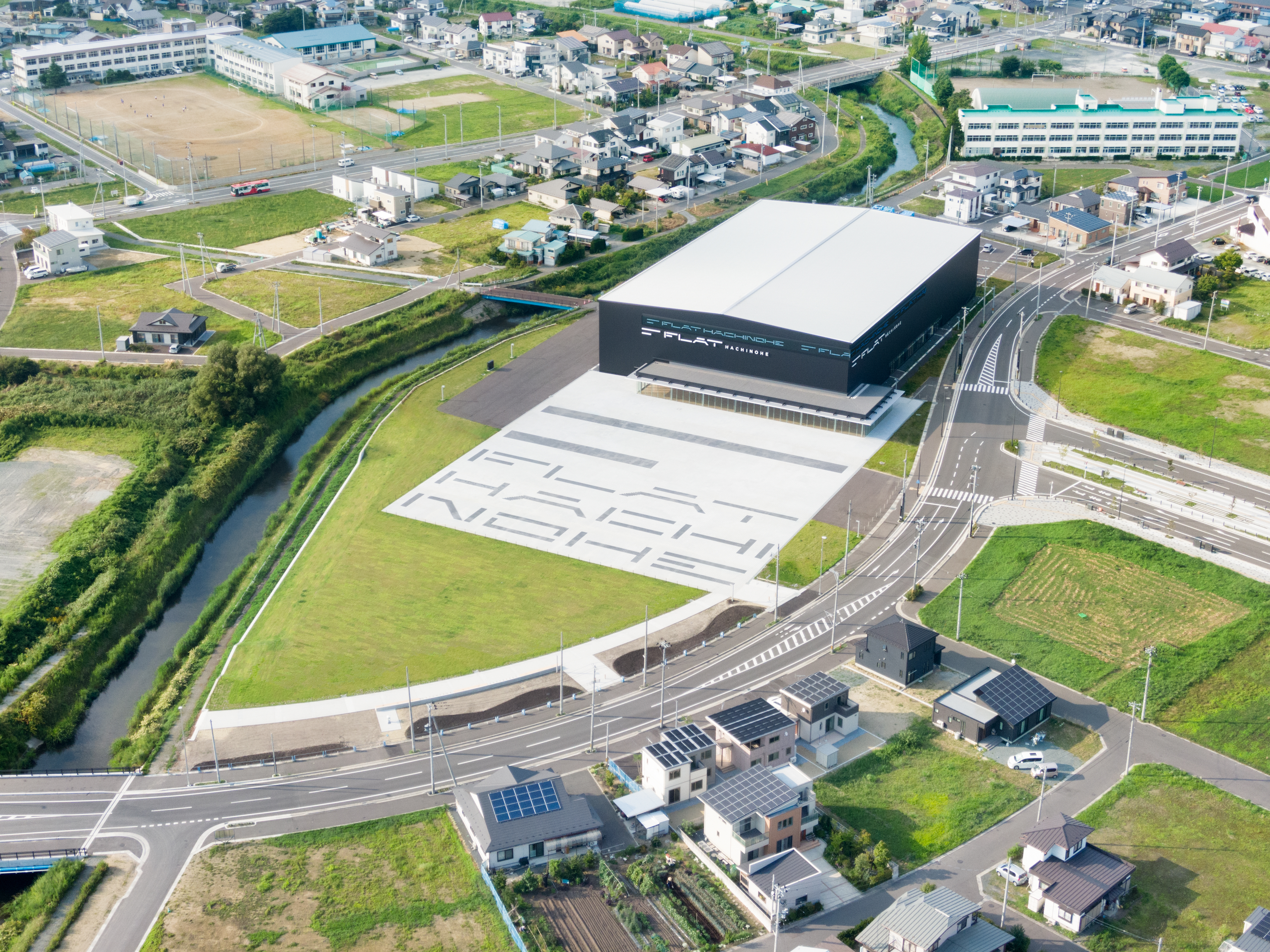

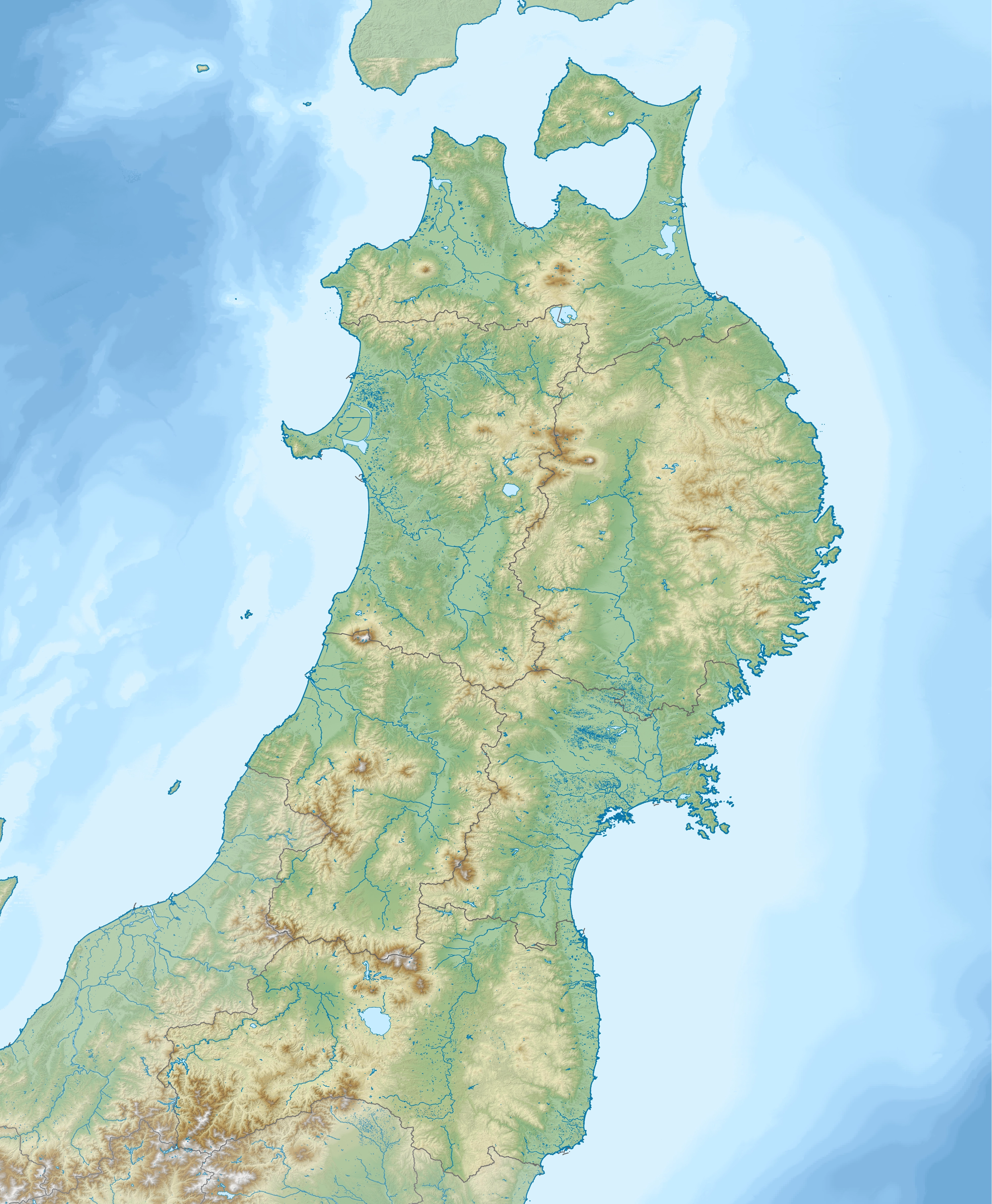
- Location within Aomori Prefecture Location within Tohoku, Japan Location within Japan
- Interactive map of Flat Hachinohe
- Full name: フラットアリーナ
- Address: 7-7, Sanjome, Shriuchimachi, Hachinohe, Aomori
- Owner: Xross Sports Marketing
- Operator: Xross Sports Marketing
- Capacity: Ice hockey: 3,500; Basketball:5,000
- Public transit: Hachinohe Station

Construction
- Groundbreaking: December 2018
- Opened: 1 April 2020
- Cost: JPY 3.6 billion
- General contractor: Toda Corporation

Tenants
- Tohoku Free Blades; Aomori Wat's

Website
- flathachinohe.com

The Flat Hachinohe is an arena in the city of Hachinohe, Aomori, Japan. It is used for ice hockey and figure skating and is the home arena of Tohoku Free Blades of the Asia League Ice Hockey.
