= Kim Sang-wook (ice hockey) =

South Korean ice hockey player (born 1988)

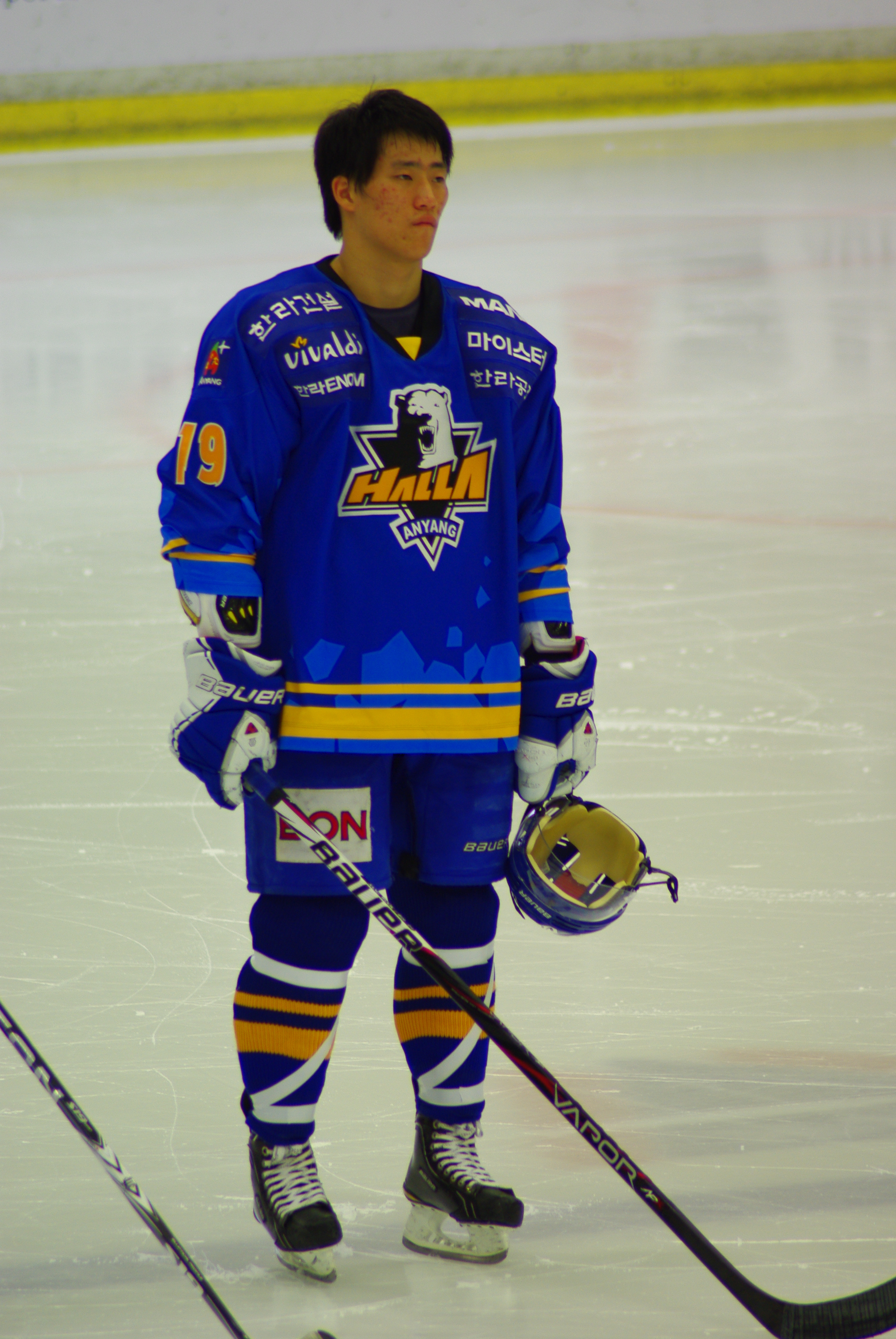
- Born: 21 April 1988 (age 37) Seoul, South Korea
- Height: 1.80 m (5 ft 11 in)
- Weight: 85 kg (187 lb; 13 st 5 lb)
- Position: Left wing
- Shoots: Left
- ALIH team Former teams: Anyang Halla; Daemyung Sangmu
- National team: South Korea
- Playing career: 2010–present

- Kim Sang-wook
- Hangul: 김상욱
- RR: Gim Sanguk
- MR: Kim Sanguk

Medal record

Ice hockey

Representing South Korea

Asian Winter Games
| Bronze medal – third place | 2025 Harbin | Ice hockey |

Kim Sang-wook (born 21 April 1988) is a South Korean professional ice hockey left winger who plays for Anyang Halla of Asia League Ice Hockey. Internationally, he has played for the South Korean national team at the junior and senior levels, and participated at the 2018 Winter Olympics.
