= Yokohama Grits =

Professional ice hockey team in Yokohama, Japan

- City: Yokohama, Kanagawa
- League: Asia League Ice Hockey
- Founded: 2 May 2019; 6 years ago
- Home arena: Kosé Shin-Yokohama Skate Center
- Colours: Blue, black, white
- Owner(s): Akihito Usui
- Head coach: Yuji Iwamoto
- Website: grits-sport.com

The Yokohama Grits (Japanese: 横浜グリッツ, romanized: Yokohama gurittsu) are a professional ice hockey team based in Yokohama, Japan. They are a members of Asia League Ice Hockey and play their home games at the Kosé Shin-Yokohama Skate Center.

The team's mascot is a stylized beluga whale named Guluga (Japanese: グルーガ). They also have a dedicated cheerleading squad named GRITS TOPAZ.

== History ==
The Yokohama Grits were founded on 2 May 2019 by Grits Sports Innovators Corporation, an organisation led by Akihito Usui. The Grits are the first ice hockey team based in the Greater Tokyo Area since the Seibu Prince Rabbits folded in 2009. On 2 June 2020 the team was announced as the eighth member of Asia League Ice Hockey, with former NHL player Mike Kennedy serving as the head coach. Due to the COVID-19 pandemic in Asia, the league cancelled its planned 2020–21 season, and a three-country Asia League tournament was scheduled instead. In October of the same year, the Grits took part in the Asia League Japan Cup.
