= Ice hockey at the 2015 Winter Universiade =

2015 Winter Universiade men's tournament
Tournament details
- Host country: Spain
- Venues: 2 (in 1 host city)
- Dates: February 3–14
- Teams: 11

Final positions
- Champions: Russia (6th title)
- Runners-up: Kazakhstan
- Third place: Canada
- Fourth place: Czech Republic

Tournament statistics
- Games played: 33
- Goals scored: 255 (7.73 per game)
- Attendance: 42,937 (1,301 per game)
- Scoring leader: (Slovakia) Peter Gapa (12 points)

Official website
- granada2015.org

2015 Winter Universiade women's tournament
Tournament details
- Host country: Spain
- Venues: 2 (in 1 host city)
- Dates: February 4–12
- Teams: 7

Final positions
- Champions: Russia (1st title)
- Runners-up: Canada
- Third place: Japan
- Fourth place: China

Tournament statistics
- Games played: 16
- Goals scored: 115 (7.19 per game)
- Attendance: 5,658 (354 per game)
- Scoring leader: (Russia) Olga Sosina (13 points)

Official website
- granada2015.org

Ice hockey at the 2015 Winter Universiade was held from February 3 through February 14 at the Granada Sport Palace and the nearby Mulhacen Pavilion in Granada. In most cases, men's matches were played at the Granada Sport Palace and women's matches were played at the Mulhacen Pavilion, although exceptions were made for the women's semifinals and medal games played in the larger Granada Sport Palace, while some lower men's placement games and one quarterfinal were played at the Mulhacen Pavilion. The draw to place the teams - 11 in the men's tournament and seven in the women's tournament, including the hosting Spain sides in both cases - into their assigned pools took place on September 25, 2014.

== Venues ==
Granada
Men	Women
Granada Sport Palace; Capacity: 9000	Mulhacen Pavilion; Capacity: 500

== Men ==
=== Preliminary round ===
Eleven participating teams were placed in the following three groups. After playing a round-robin within the group, the teams ranked 6th to 11th overall had to play and win a qualification game to advance to the quarterfinals, while the teams ranked 1st through 5th overall advanced directly to the quarterfinals.

Teams received 3 points for a regulation win, 2 points for an overtime/shootout win and 1 point for an overtime/shootout loss. They were then seeded for the playoff round by points per game played, then by goal differential.

All game box scores via wuni15.sportresult.com.

==== Group A ====
Team	Pld	W	OTW	OTL	L	GF	GA	GD	Pts	Qualification
Czech Republic	3	3	0	0	0	20	5	+15	9	Advanced to quarterfinals
Slovakia	3	2	0	0	1	21	9	+12	6	Advanced to quarterfinals
Spain	3	1	0	0	2	12	10	+2	3	Qualification playoffs
China	3	0	0	0	3	1	30	−29	0	Qualification playoffs

All times are local (UTC+1).

February 4, 2015; 13:30	Slovakia	3–6 (1–3, 0–2, 2–1)	Czech Republic	Granada Sport Palace, Granada; Attendance: 150

Game reference

Jan Ziak
Goalies
Patrik Polívka
Referee:
Andris Ansons (LAT)
Linesmen:
Timo Heinonen (FIN)
Anders Nyqvist (SWE)

	0–1	1:43 – J. Kolda
	0–2	2:52 – J. Dalecky (J. Peslar, J. Skvor)
14:13 – M. Trencan (M. Marusiak)	1–2
	1–3	17:16 – P. Skoloud (D. Arnost, D. Steiner)
	1–4	38:04 – T. Stastny (F. Matejka, D. Zachar)
	1–5	38:24 – J. Dalecky (T. Stastny, D. Zachar)
41:13 – P. Gapa (J. Pardavy)	2–5
	2–6	48:30 – J. Dalecky (J. Skvor)
55:28 – D. Mihalik (P. Lunter, N. Ketner) (PP)	3–6

10 min
Penalties
37 min
17
Shots
49

February 4, 2015; 20:30	China	0–8 (0–1, 0–2, 0–5)	Spain	Granada Sport Palace, Granada; Attendance: 1100

Game reference

Sun Zehao
Wu Jiankun
Goalies
Ander Alcaine
Referee:
Tim Tzirtziganis (BEL)
Linesmen:
Flavio Ambrosetti (SUI)
Lukas Kacej (SVK)

0–1	19:37 – J. Garcia-Arias (J. Munoz, H. Alastruey)
0–2	24:08 – P. Puyuelo (A. Ubieto, I. Gainza)
0–3	34:32 – A. Ubieto (P. Fuentes, C. Quevedo)
0–4	40:53 – P. Gonzalez (C. Quevedo, A. Ubieto) (PP)
0–5	43:57 – P. Fuentes (C. Quevedo, P. Gonzalez)
0–6	47:42 – J. Munoz (A. Betran)
0–7	51:51 – P. Gonzalez (A. Ubieto, P. Fuentes) (PP)
0–8	55:52 – A. Betran (A. Ubieto)

16 min
Penalties
12 min
22
Shots
79

February 6, 2015; 17:00	Spain	2–5 (0–1, 0–4, 2–0)	Czech Republic	Granada Sport Palace, Granada; Attendance: 1850

Game reference

Ander Alcaine
Goalies
Patrik Polívka
Referee:
Michael Campbell (CAN)
Linesmen:
Liu Ren (CHN)
Nathan VanOosten (CAN)

	0–1	1:13 – M. Valasek (J. Skvor, M. Brzobohaty)
	0–2	26:44 – F. Vojacek (D. Arnost)
	0–3	33:18 – D. Zachar (J. Dalecky, L. Vrana) (PP)
	0–4	34:11 – F. Svaricek (D. Arnost, P. Hucko) (PP)
	0–5	36:03 – D. Arnost (M. Gutwald)
45:26 – A. Carbonell (J. Garcia-Arias, A. Pedraz)	1–5
59:26 – C. Quevedo (P. Fuentes)	2–5

16 min
Penalties
6 min
15
Shots
71

February 6, 2015; 20:30	Slovakia	13–1 (3–0, 5–1, 5–0)	China	Granada Sport Palace, Granada; Attendance: 1000

Game reference

Juraj Halo
Goalies
Sun Zehao
Wu Jiankun
Referee:
Patric Bjalkander (SWE)
Linesmen:
Flavio Ambrosetti (SUI)
Dmitry Trofimov (KAZ)

1:06 – P. Lunter	1–0
4:14 – E. Piacka (M. Uhnak)	2–0
18:09 – M. Uhnak (P. Szabo) (SH)	3–0
25:14 – D. Mihalik (P. Gapa, T. Rusina) (PP)	4–0
	4–1	28:29 – Zuo T.
30:42 – M. Budiak (J. Zlocha, M. Marusiak)	5–1
33:36 – J. Zlocha (P. Kopecky) (SH)	6–1
34:35 – M. Uhnak (E. Piacka, A. Sucharda)	7–1
36:22 – P. Gapa (P. Szabo)	8–1
42:47 – K. Baca	9–1
47:47 – N. Ketner (D. Mihalik, P. Gapa) (PP)	10–1
54:53 – P. Lunter (M. Uhnak, E. Piacka) (PP)	11–1
55:53 – J. Zlocha (M. Trencan, M. Marusiak)	12–1
59:09 – J. Pardavy (P. Kopecky, T. Rusina) (PP)	13–1

14 min
Penalties
28 min
64
Shots
11

February 8, 2015; 17:00	Czech Republic	9–0 (1–0, 3–0, 5–0)	China	Granada Sport Palace, Granada; Attendance: 1100

Game reference

Patrik Polívka
Goalies
Sun Zehao
Wu Jiankun
Referee:
Marc Piguillem Perez de Rozas (ESP)
Linesmen:
Flavio Ambrosetti (SUI)
Nathan VanOosten (CAN)

19:52 – D. Zachar (J. Dalecky, D. Steiner) (PP)	1–0
27:12 – F. Matejka (P. Skoloud, T. Stastny)	2–0
32:22 – R. Vanek (M. Brzobohaty, F. Svaricek)	3–0
36:59 – D. Zachar (J. Dalecky)	4–0
43:57 – R. Vanek (J. Kolda, J. Peslar) (PP)	5–0
47:30 – R. Vanek (L. Vrana, J. Kolda)	6–0
55:51 – J. Dalecky	7–0
58:27 – R. Vanek (M. Brzobohaty)	8–0
58:43 – D. Zachar (J. Muller)	9–0

4 min
Penalties
10 min
101
Shots
4

February 8, 2015; 20:30	Spain	2–5 (1–1, 0–3, 1–1)	Slovakia	Granada Sport Palace, Granada; Attendance: 5100

Game reference

Ander Alcaine
Goalies
Juraj Halo
Referee:
Iurii Oskirko (RUS)
Linesmen:
Timo Heinonen (FIN)
Liu Ren (CHN)

	0–1	3:01 – M. Uhnak (D. Mihalik, E. Piacka)
10:24 – J. Garcia-Arias (A. Betran, I. Gainza) (PP)	1–1
	1–2	29:24 – T. Rusina (P. Palovic, P. Kopecky)
	1–3	32:42 – E. Piacka (M. Trencan)
	1–4	37:04 – P. Gapa (J. Pardavy)
	1–5	44:59 – N. Ketner (D. Mihalik, M. Uhnak)
59:55 – P. Fuentes (A. Pedraz, J. Munoz) (PP)	2–5

12 min
Penalties
16 min
29
Shots
59

==== Group B ====
Team	Pld	W	OTW	OTL	L	GF	GA	GD	Pts	Qualification
Canada	3	3	0	0	0	23	4	+19	9	Advanced to quarterfinals
Russia	3	2	0	0	1	21	6	+15	6	Advanced to quarterfinals
Sweden	3	0	1	0	2	6	16	−10	2	Qualification playoffs
South Korea	3	0	0	1	2	5	29	−24	1	Qualification playoffs

All times are local (UTC+1).

February 3, 2015; 17:00	South Korea	1–11 (1–1, 0–4, 0–6)	Canada	Granada Sport Palace, Granada; Attendance: 320

Game reference

Bae Jang-woo
Goalies
Ryan Holfeld
Kristopher Lazaruk
Referee:
Patric Bjalkander (SWE)
Linesmen:
Timo Heinonen (FIN)
Gjermund Lorentsen Bakli (NOR)

	0–1	12:54 – E. Pearce (K. McFaull)
19:36 – Han G-h. (PP)	1–1
	1–2	23:44 – T. Foster (K. Reddick) (PS)
	1–3	29:09 – C. Collins (K. Reddick)
	1–4	30:46 – J. Hickmott (K. Curran, T. Foster)
	1–5	34:45 – C. Cartier (T. Fiddler, K. McFaull)
	1–6	43:22 – K. King (T. Foster, K. Curran)
	1–7	46:37 – L. Koper (SH)
	1–8	50:11 – K. King (L. Paulsen, J. Craige)
	1–9	56:46 – K. King (J. Hickmott) (PP)
	1–10	57:43 – L. Koper (C. Collins, K. Reddick)
	1–11	58:43 – C. Cartier

8 min
Penalties
22 min
14
Shots
68

February 3, 2015; 20:30	Russia	5–1 (2–0, 1–1, 2–0)	Sweden	Granada Sport Palace, Granada; Attendance: 800

Game reference

Gleb Evdokimov
Goalies
Arvid Ljung
Referee:
Lassi Heikkinen (FIN)
Linesmen:
Park Jun-soo (KOR)
Nathan VanOosten (CAN)

4:26 – E. Gimatov (M. Klimchuk)	1–0
13:49 – I. Petrakov (A. Lebedev)	2–0
22:07 – E. Gimatov (M. Klimchuk, A. Gordeyev)	3–0
	3–1	28:29 – S. Bergqvist (N. Gronskog, J. Thomson) (PP)
49:47 – O. Li (S. Barbashev)	4–1
53:30 – A. Fyodorov (Y. Alyoshin, N. Cherepanov)	5–1

12 min
Penalties
14 min
51
Shots
9

February 5, 2015; 13:30	Russia	13–0 (5–0, 4–0, 4–0)	South Korea	Granada Sport Palace, Granada; Attendance: 85

Game reference

Sergey Belov
Goalies
Bae Jang-woo
Lee Chang-min
Referee:
Marc Piguillem Perez de Rozas (ESP)
Linesmen:
Shunsuke Ichikawa (JPN)
Carlos Trobajo Navarro (ESP)

0:36 – T. Shingareev (I. Petrakov, A. Lebedev)	1–0
3:12 – I. Petrakov (A. Lebedev, A. Fyodorov)	2–0
7:56 – E. Viksna (I. Petrakov, A. Lebedev)	3–0
8:42 – M. Klimchuk (E. Viksna)	4–0
9:38 – A. Fyodorov (E. Krivchenko, Y. Alyoshin)	5–0
28:13 – A. Lebedev (T. Shingareev)	6–0
30:10 – S. Barbashev (A. Torchenyuk)	7–0
36:44 – E. Krivchenko (A. Fyodorov, E. Solovyov) (PP)	8–0
37:38 – S. Barbashev (A. Torchenyuk, O. Li)	9–0
41:08 – E. Viksna (O. Li)	10–0
42:54 – A. Fyodorov (E. Solovyov, E. Krivchenko)	11–0
43:05 – S. Barbashev	12–0
51:59 – M. Klimchuk (E. Gimatov)	13–0

0 min
Penalties
6 min
65
Shots
14

February 5, 2015; 17:00	Canada	7–0 (3–0, 1–0, 3–0)	Sweden	Granada Sport Palace, Granada; Attendance: 850

Game reference

Ryan Holfeld
Goalies
Emil Helin
Referee:
Iurii Oskirko (RUS)
Linesmen:
Gjermund Lorentsen Bakli (NOR)
Chris van Grinsven (BEL)

10:03 – N. Manning (M. Maxwell, J. DePape)	1–0
11:04 – K. Reddick (C. Collins, L. Paulsen)	2–0
16:51 – C. Collins (L. Koper)	3–0
37:54 – E. Pearce (M. Maxwell, C. Fowlie)	4–0
51:05 – J. Hickmott (K. King, T. Foster)	5–0
54:40 – T. Foster (L. Paulsen, J. Hickmott)	6–0
59:12 – J. Hickmott (T. Foster, K. King) (PP)	7–0

8 min
Penalties
10 min
59
Shots
10

February 7, 2015; 13:30	Sweden	5–4 SO (2–0, 0–2, 2–2) (OT: 0–0) (SO: 1–0)	South Korea	Granada Sport Palace, Granada; Attendance: 200

Game reference

Arvid Ljung
Goalies
Bae Jang-woo
Referee:
Tim Tzirtziganis (BEL)
Linesmen:
Lukas Kacej (SVK)
Carlos Trobajo Navarro (ESP)

3:30 – S. Bergqvist (F. Jigmalm, J. Thomson) (PP)	1–0
10:33 – N. Gronskog (J. Thomson, E. Lyrvall)	2–0
	2–1	21:11 – Lee S-j. (Yoon S-w.)
	2–2	27:52 – Yoon S-w. (Lee D-g., Lee S-j.) (PP)
40:44 – J. Saldeen (W. Westlund, N. Gronskog)	3–2
	3–3	40:59 – Lee S-j. (Kim T-g.)
	3–4	45:51 – Oh S-a. (SH)
46:47 – D. Andersson (A. Gronros) (PP)	4–4

A. Gronros (miss)
S. Bergqvist (miss)
D. Andersson
Shootout
(miss) Lee S-j.
(miss) Han G-h.
(miss) Oh S-a.
10 min
Penalties
12 min
35
Shots
32

February 7, 2015; 17:00	Canada	5–3 (0–2, 3–1, 2–0)	Russia	Granada Sport Palace, Granada; Attendance: 2600

Game reference

Kristopher Lazaruk
Goalies
Gleb Evdokimov
Referee:
Andris Ansons (LAT)
Linesmen:
Shunsuke Ichikawa (JPN)
Anders Nyqvist (SWE)

	0–1	7:53 – I. Petrakov (A. Lebedev, R. Rafikov)
	0–2	12:42 – R. Rafikov (A. Fyodorov)
20:27 – K. Reddick (L. Koper, J. Rowley)	1–2
21:36 – T. Fiddler (J. Rowley, C. Cartier)	2–2
	2–3	30:16 – E. Krivchenko (A. Fyodorov) (PP)
36:48 – J. Craige (J. Rowley, M. Maxwell)	3–3
40:33 – J. Craige (PP)	4–3
45:47 – T. Fiddler (J. Rowley, J. Craige)	5–3

24 min
Penalties
12 min
25
Shots
33

==== Group C ====
Team	Pld	W	OTW	OTL	L	GF	GA	GD	Pts	Qualification
Kazakhstan	2	1	0	1	0	5	5	0	4	Advanced to quarterfinals
Japan	2	1	0	0	1	5	5	0	3	Qualification playoffs
United States	2	0	1	0	1	5	5	0	2	Qualification playoffs

All times are local (UTC+1).

February 3, 2015; 13:30	Kazakhstan	3–2 (0–0, 2–1, 1–1)	Japan	Granada Sport Palace, Granada; Attendance: 257

Game reference

Mikhail Smolnikov
Goalies
Takuto Onoda
Referee:
Michael Campbell (CAN)
Linesmen:
Liu Ren (CHN)
Chris van Grinsven (BEL)

	0–1	23:30 – M. Furuhashi
26:04 – R. Safin (V. Fedossenko)	1–1
37:38 – G. Nesterov (Y. Popovich)	2–1
	2–2	54:25 – H. Satoh (T. Echigo)
58:38 – I. Kovzalov	3–2

12 min
Penalties
8 min
30
Shots
25

February 5, 2015; 20:30	United States	2–3 (0–0, 0–1, 2–2)	Japan	Granada Sport Palace, Granada; Attendance: 1250

Game reference

Matt Cooper
Goalies
Shun Hitomi
Referee:
Tomas Horak (CZE)
Linesmen:
Park Jun-soo (KOR)
Dmitry Trofimov (KAZ)

	0–1	36:30 – M. Omuku (K. Otsu) (SH)
	0–2	40:49 – K. Kawamura (I. Horiuchi, M. Omuku) (PP)
	0–3	44:56 – I. Ikeda (K. Matsukane) (PP)
53:46 – B. Balent (PS)	1–3
58:46 – C. Joseph (T. Benson, B. Balent) (PP)	2–3

18 min
Penalties
20 min
52
Shots
22

February 7, 2015; 20:30	Kazakhstan	2–3 SO (0–1, 1–1, 1–0) (OT: 0–0) (SO: 0–1)	United States	Granada Sport Palace, Granada; Attendance: 2350

Game reference

Mikhail Smolnikov
Goalies
Matt Cooper
Referee:
Lassi Heikkinen (FIN)
Linesmen:
Gjermund Lorentsen Bakli (NOR)
Park Jun-soo (KOR)

	0–1	7:52 – L. Hannon (J. Breslin, J. Kascsak)
	0–2	21:29 – B. Bodette (E. McGovern, C. Schmidt) (PP)
29:37 – D. Kenbayev (G. Nesterov, A. Antsiferov) (PP)	1–2
59:01 – P. Zyatkov (M. Kachulin)	2–2

I. Kovzalov (miss)
P. Zyatkov (miss)
M. Kachulin (miss)
Shootout
B. Johnson
(miss) J. Greenberg
6 min
Penalties
22 min
40
Shots
31

=== Playoff round ===
Qualification
7	Spain	3
10	South Korea	4
6	Japan	12
11	China	3
8	United States	4
9	Sweden	1

Quarterfinals
2	Czech Republic	12
10	South Korea	0
3	Kazakhstan	4
6	Japan	1
1	Canada	4
8	United States	0
4	Russia	7
5	Slovakia	0

Semifinals
2	Czech Republic	1
3	Kazakhstan	2
1	Canada	2
4	Russia	3*

Gold Medal
3	Kazakhstan	1
4	Russia	3
Bronze Medal
1	Canada	6
2	Czech Republic	2

* denotes shootout victory

All times are local (UTC+1).

==== Qualification ====
February 10, 2015; 13:30	Japan	12–3 (4–2, 1–1, 7–0)	China	Granada Sport Palace, Granada; Attendance: 300

Game reference

Takuto Onoda
Goalies
Sun Zehao
Wu Jiankun
Referee:
Patric Bjalkander (SWE)
Linesmen:
Anders Nyqvist (SWE)
Carlos Trobajo Navarro (ESP)

1:36 – M. Furuhashi (I. Ikeda, K. Matsukane) (PP)	1–0
7:20 – M. Furuhashi	2–0
8:28 – I. Ikeda (K. Otsu, I. Horiuchi)	3–0
	3–1	8:48 – Lu H.
	3–2	17:28 – Wu H. (Zhang Z., Nan J.) (PP)
18:19 – T. Konno (M. Omuku, M. Furuhashi)	4–2
33:33 – M. Furuhashi (T. Konno, H. Satoh) (PP)	5–2
	5–3	38:02 – Lu H. (Yue X.) (PP)
41:57 – I. Ikeda (K. Tanaka, K. Koizumi)	6–3
44:55 – I. Ikeda (H. Satoh) (PP)	7–3
47:16 – K. Kawamura (M. Omuku, K. Tanaka) (PP)	8–3
51:13 – H. Satoh (K. Matsukane) (PP)	9–3
54:51 – T. Konno (M. Furuhashi)	10–3
56:01 – K. Kawamura (M. Omuku, D. Ohba)	11–3
59:22 – S. Tateda (H. Satoh)	12–3

35 min
Penalties
30 min
83
Shots
15

February 10, 2015; 17:00	United States	4–1 (0–0, 1–1, 3–0)	Sweden	Granada Sport Palace, Granada; Attendance: 800

Game reference

Matt Cooper
Goalies
Arvid Ljung
Referee:
Michael Campbell (CAN)
Linesmen:
Lukas Kacej (SVK)
Gjermund Lorentsen Bakli (NOR)

	0–1	27:52 – T. Hertzberg (D. Andersson) (PP)
30:31 – N. Zern (B. Johnson, J. Olen)	1–1
50:57 – B. Balent (C. Schmidt, C. Burkemper)	2–1
52:00 – C. Schmidt (L. Hannon, S. Brewster) (PP)	3–1
56:54 – E. McGovern (J. Breslin) (SH, EN)	4–1

28 min
Penalties
32 min
61
Shots
18

February 10, 2015; 20:30	Spain	3–4 (1–3, 1–0, 1–1)	South Korea	Granada Sport Palace, Granada; Attendance: 2650

Game reference

Ignacio Garcia
Ander Alcaine
Goalies
Bae Jang-woo
Referee:
Tomas Horak (CZE)
Linesmen:
Shunsuke Ichikawa (JPN)
Chris van Grinsven (BEL)

	0–1	5:27 – Oh S-a. (Kang Y-s., Lee S-w.)
	0–2	7:34 – Ha J-j. (Hwang W-t., Lee S-w.)
11:53 – G. Gonzalez (P. Puyuelo)	1–2
	1–3	13:42 – Han G-h. (Kang Y-s., Yoon S-w.)
21:20 – G. Gonzalez (A. Carbonell, A. Ubieto)	2–3
	2–4	48:31 – Lee S-j. (Lee D-g., Yoon S-w.)
48:44 – P. Gonzalez (I. Gainza, P. Fuentes)	3–4

6 min
Penalties
8 min
24
Shots
36

==== 9th–11th placement round ====
Team	Pld	W	OTW	OTL	L	GF	GA	GD	Pts
Sweden	2	2	0	0	0	9	1	+8	6
Spain	2	1	0	0	1	9	7	+2	3
China	2	0	0	0	2	2	12	−10	0

February 12, 2015; 13:30	Sweden	5–1 (2–1, 3–0, 0–0)	Spain	Granada Sport Palace, Granada; Attendance: 350

Game reference

Emil Helin
Goalies
Ander Alcaine
Ignacio Garcia
Referee:
Tomas Horak (CZE)
Linesmen:
Lukas Kacej (SVK)
Chris van Grinsven (BEL)

	0–1	1:45 – J. Munoz (P. Gonzalez, A. Pedraz) (PP)
8:25 – F. Jigmalm (N. Gronskog, E. Lyrvall)	1–1
12:49 – D. Jonsson (J. Backesten, D. Andersson)	2–1
30:40 – M. Ortevall (F. Jigmalm, M. Orrsveden)	3–1
33:27 – E. Lyrvall (F. Peltoniemi, F. Jigmalm) (PP)	4–1
34:50 – J. Thomson (D. Andersson, D. Jonsson)	5–1

8 min
Penalties
47 min
38
Shots
31

February 13, 2015; 13:30	Spain	8–2 (1–0, 4–1, 3–1)	China	Granada Sport Palace, Granada; Attendance: 200

Game reference

Ignacio Garcia
Goalies
Wu Jiankun
Sun Zehao
Referee:
Andris Ansons (LAT)
Linesmen:
Shunsuke Ichikawa (JPN)
Park Jun-soo (KOR)

17:03 – P. Fuentes (A. Pedraz, J. Munoz)	1–0
25:38 – J. Bravo (J. Garcia-Arias)	2–0
28:06 – J. Munoz (A. Ubieto, P. Fuentes) (PP)	3–0
30:45 – J. Garcia-Arias (A. Pedraz, J. Bravo)	4–0
33:56 – J. Garcia-Arias (A. Pedraz, J. Bravo)	5–0
	5–1	35:17 – Yu M. (Wu H., Huang P.)
40:25 – J. Munoz (P. Fuentes, A. Ubieto) (PP)	6–1
	6–2	47:21 – Zhang Z. (SH)
48:54 – J. Garcia-Arias (G. Gonzalez, A. Betran) (PP)	7–2
49:43 – J. Munoz (P. Fuentes, G. Gonzalez)	8–2

14 min
Penalties
34 min
59
Shots
21

February 14, 2015; 11:00	China	0–4 (0–2, 0–0, 0–2)	Sweden	Mulhacen Pavilion, Granada; Attendance: 50

Game reference

Sun Zehao
Wu Jiankun
Goalies
Hendrik Hvitfeldt
Referee:
Tim Tzirtziganis (BEL)
Linesmen:
Lukáš Kačej (SVK)
Chris van Grinsven (BEL)

0–1	3:00 – M. Ortevall (M. Orrsveden, J. Thomson)
0–2	11:48 – N. Gronskog (J. Backesten, E. Lyrvall)
0–3	43:31 – D. Jonsson (T. Hertzberg, J. Saldeen)
0–4	53:17 – N. Gronskog (J. Thomson, E. Lyrvall) (PP)

10 min
Penalties
16 min
11
Shots
79

==== Quarterfinals ====
February 11, 2015; 13:30	Russia	7–0 (3–0, 0–0, 4–0)	Slovakia	Granada Sport Palace, Granada; Attendance: 300

Game reference

Sergey Belov
Goalies
Juraj Halo
Referees:
Patric Bjalkander (SWE)
Lassi Heikkinen (FIN)
Linesmen:
Flavio Ambrosetti (SUI)
Nathan VanOosten (CAN)

8:37 – E. Gimatov (I. Petrakov)	1–0
15:40 – E. Krivchenko (A. Fyodorov, A. Lebedev) (PP)	2–0
16:08 – E. Gimatov (A. Bolshakov, A. Lebedev)	3–0
49:25 – E. Krivchenko (A. Fyodorov) (PP)	4–0
50:46 – E. Gimatov (A. Lebedev, I. Petrakov)	5–0
55:41 – E. Solovyov (E. Krivchenko, K. Maslov) (PP)	6–0
57:49 – E. Viksna (E. Gimatov, R. Rafikov) (PP)	7–0

10 min
Penalties
12 min
47
Shots
23

February 11, 2015; 17:00	Czech Republic	12–0 (5–0, 4–0, 3–0)	South Korea	Granada Sport Palace, Granada; Attendance: 850

Game reference

Patrik Polívka
Goalies
Bae Jang-woo
Referees:
Michael Campbell (CAN)
Tim Tzirtziganis (BEL)
Linesmen:
Shunsuke Ichikawa (JPN)
Carlos Trobajo Navarro (ESP)

2:29 – J. Dalecky (PP)	1–0
5:05 – J. Dalecky (M. Valasek)	2–0
14:51 – J. Muller (D. Steiner, D. Zachar)	3–0
15:22 – F. Svaricek (L. Vrana)	4–0
16:26 – D. Arnost (P. Hucko, D. Novak)	5–0
21:38 – M. Gutwald (J. Dalecky) (PP)	6–0
26:37 – D. Novak (P. Hucko, D. Arnost)	7–0
32:55 – J. Muller (M. Gutwald, D. Zachar)	8–0
37:56 – J. Muller (D. Zachar, M. Gutwald) (PP)	9–0
48:40 – D. Novak (P. Hucko)	10–0
54:58 – P. Skoloud (M. Valasek, J. Skvor)	11–0
59:35 – L. Vrana (M. Brzobohaty)	12–0

6 min
Penalties
8 min
59
Shots
13

February 11, 2015; 20:30	Canada	4–0 (2–0, 0–0, 2–0)	United States	Granada Sport Palace, Granada; Attendance: 4400

Game reference

Ryan Holfeld
Goalies
Matt Cooper
Referees:
Andris Ansons (LAT)
Iurii Oskirko (RUS)
Linesmen:
Timo Heinonen (FIN)
Anders Nyqvist (SWE)

17:30 – K. Reddick (L. Koper)	1–0
18:44 – M. Maxwell (J. DePape)	2–0
43:58 – K. Reddick (K. Curran, L. Koper) (PP)	3–0
59:38 – K. Reddick (L. Koper, J. DePape)	4–0

10 min
Penalties
26 min
42
Shots
20

February 11, 2015; 21:15	Kazakhstan	4–1 (2–0, 0–1, 2–0)	Japan	Mulhacen Pavilion, Granada; Attendance: 300

Game reference

Mikhail Smolnikov
Goalies
Shun Hitomi
Referees:
Lassi Heikkinen (FIN)
Tomas Horak (CZE)
Linesmen:
Liu Ren (CHN)
Park Jun-soo (KOR)

7:46 – Y. Popovich (N. Belgibayev, D. Kenbayev) (PP)	1–0
10:10 – M. Kachulin (P. Zyatkov, I. Gulyakov)	2–0
	2–1	26:52 – S. Tateda (T. Echigo)
46:17 – V. Yelakov (D. Akhmetov)	3–1
58:55 – V. Grebenshchikov (SH, EN)	4–1

33 min
Penalties
28 min
28
Shots
23

==== 5th–8th placement matches ====
February 12, 2015; 17:00	Slovakia	5–4 SO (4–1, 0–2, 0–1) (OT: 0–0) (SO: 1–0)	United States	Mulhacen Pavilion, Granada; Attendance: 375

Game reference

Juraj Halo
Goalies
Matt Cooper
Joseph Olen
Referee:
Iurii Oskirko (RUS)
Linesmen:
Flavio Ambrosetti (SUI)
Liu Ren (CHN)

1:02 – T. Rusina (P. Gapa)	1–0
1:31 – R. Hus (M. Marusiak)	2–0
14:17 – T. Rusina (P. Szabo, K. Baca)	3–0
	3–1	16:54 – J. Breslin (B. Bodette, C. Schmidt) (PP)
19:42 – E. Piacka (R. Hus, J. Kentos)	4–1
	4–2	24:58 – L. Hannon (S. Murphy, C. Schmidt)
	4–3	33:13 – C. Joseph (C. Burkemper, J. Breslin) (SH)
	4–4	59:55 – S.Murphy (M. Harris)

M. Uhnak (miss)
P. Gapa
P. Lunter (miss)
Shootout
(miss) B. Johnson
(miss) C. Schmidt
(miss) L. Hannon
16 min
Penalties
16 min
38
Shots
56

February 12, 2015; 20:30	Japan	4–1 (1–1, 0–0, 3–0)	South Korea	Mulhacen Pavilion, Granada; Attendance: 250

Game reference

Takuto Onoda
Goalies
Bae Jang-woo
Referee:
Marc Puguillem Perez de Rozas (ESP)
Linesmen:
Gjermund Lorentsen Bakli (NOR)
Carlos Trobajo Navarro (ESP)

	0–1	4:44 – Ha J-j. (Ban H-s.)
7:57 – K. Tanaka (K. Suzuki, I. Ikeda)	1–1
42:01 – K. Kawamura (K. Otsu, D. Ohba)	2–1
46:01 – M. Omuku (S. Hitosato)	3–1
48:25 – Y. Yokoyama (I. Horiuchi, S. Nakajima) (PP)	4–1

22 min
Penalties
40 min
47
Shots
24

==== 7th place match ====
February 13, 2015; 17:00	United States	8–3 (1–1, 4–0, 3–2)	South Korea	Mulhacen Pavilion, Granada; Attendance: NA

Game reference

Matt Cooper
Goalies
Bae Jang-woo
Referee:
Marc Piguillem Perez de Rozas (ESP)
Linesmen:
Liu Ren (CHN)
Chris van Grinsven (BEL)

	0–1	2:38 – Cho H-k. (Yoon S-w.)
8:56 – J. Breslin (L. Hannon, E. McGovern)	1–1
22:45 – N. Zern (B. Johnson, J. Kascsak) (PP)	2–1
26:16 – E. Solorzano (J. Breslin, L. Hannon)	3–1
34:44 – J. Breslin (C. Schmidt, L. Hannon)	4–1
35:16 – J. Olen (B. Johnson, S. Brewster)	5–1
44:07 – S. Brewster (L. Hannon, J. Breslin)	6–1
	6–2	47:29 – Kang Y-s. (Oh S-a.)
50:57 – J. Kascsak (C. Schmidt, N. Zern)	7–2
53:58 – S. Brewster (C. Schmidt, N. Zern)	8–2
	8–3	54:39 – Kang Y-s. (Oh S-a.)

6 min
Penalties
6 min
46
Shots
24

==== 5th place match ====
February 13, 2015; 20:30	Slovakia	8–3 (2–1, 1–1, 5–1)	Japan	Mulhacen Pavilion, Granada; Attendance: 250

Game reference

Juraj Halo
Goalies
Shun Hitomi
Referee:
Tomas Horak (CZE)
Linesmen:
Gjermund Lorentsen Bakli (NOR)
Carlos Trobajo Navarro (ESP)

4:44 – P. Gapa (M. Trencan)	1–0
	1–1	12:51 – S. Nakajima
14:49 – M. Trencan (P. Gapa)	2–1
21:17 – T. Rusina (P. Gapa, J. Kentos) (PP)	3–1
	3–2	29:32 – M. Furuhashi
46:51 – E. Piacka (M. Uhnak, D. Mihalik)	4–2
	4–3	48:34 – I. Ikeda (K. Matsukane) (PP)
56:26 – P. Gapa (M. Trencan)	5–3
57:32 – P. Gapa (M. Trencan) (EN)	6–3
57:43 – P. Szabo (J. Kentos, T. Rusina)	7–3
59:48 – M. Trencan (R. Hus, N. Ketner)	8–3

24 min
Penalties
8 min
26
Shots
37

==== Semifinals ====
February 13, 2015; 17:00	Canada	2–3 SO (0–1, 1–0, 1–1) (OT: 0–0) (SO: 0–1)	Russia	Granada Sport Palace, Granada; Attendance: 4000

Game reference

Kristopher Lazaruk
Goalies
Sergey Belov
Referees:
Patric Bjalkander (SWE)
Lassi Heikkinen (FIN)
Linesmen:
Timo Heinonen (FIN)
Anders Nyqvist (SWE)

	0–1	3:40 – I. Petrakov
23:01 – L. Koper (C. Cartier, N. Manning) (PP)	1–1
41:25 – C. Collins (N. Manning, K. Curran) (PP)	2–1
	2–2	48:11 – T. Shingareev (M. Klimchuk)

C. Collins (miss)
T. Foster (miss)
Shootout
S. Barbashev
T. Shingareev
14 min
Penalties
14 min
39
Shots
34

February 13, 2015; 20:30	Czech Republic	1–2 (0–1, 0–1, 1–0)	Kazakhstan	Granada Sport Palace, Granada; Attendance: 2400

Game reference

Patrik Polívka
Goalies
Mikhail Smolnikov
Referees:
Michael Campbell (CAN)
Iurii Oskirko (RUS)
Linesmen:
Flavio Ambrosetti (SUI)
Nathan VanOosten (CAN)

	0–1	12:16 – A. Antsiferov
	0–2	28:17 – P. Zyatkov (M. Kachulin, I. Gulyakov)
51:18 – P. Školoud (F. Matejka)	1–2

14 min
Penalties
12 min
41
Shots
13

==== Bronze medal match ====
February 14, 2015; 12:00	Canada	6–2 (2–0, 0–1, 4–1)	Czech Republic	Granada Sport Palace, Granada; Attendance: 700

Game reference

Kristopher Lazaruk
Goalies
Patrik Polívka
Referees:
Andris Ansons (LAT)
Iurii Oskirko (RUS)
Linesmen:
Gjermund Lorentsen Bakli (NOR)
Park Jun-soo (KOR)

8:34 – K. King (M. Maxwell)	1–0
14:50 – C. Fowlie (E. Pearce, K. King)	2–0
	2–1	23:49 – M. Valasek (P. Skoloud)
	2–2	42:42 – D. Arnošt (D. Novak) (SH)
46:38 – C. Collins (M. Delahey, J. DePape)	3–2
47:17 – M. Maxwell (C. Collins, C. Fowlie)	4–2
52:23 – C. Collins (N. Manning, L. Paulsen) (PP)	5–2
57:32 – K. King (SH, EN)	6–2

16 min
Penalties
14 min
35
Shots
34

==== Gold medal match ====
February 14, 2015; 16:00	Kazakhstan	1–3 (0–2, 0–1, 1–0)	Russia	Granada Sport Palace, Granada; Attendance: 5500

Game reference

Mikhail Smolnikov
Goalies
Sergey Belov
Referees:
Michael Campbell (CAN)
Lassi Heikkinen (FIN)
Linesmen:
Anders Nyqvist (SWE)
Nathan VanOosten (CAN)

	0–1	2:36 – T. Shingareev (A. Gordeyev)
	0–2	13:31 – E. Krivchenko (M. Klimchuk)
	0–3	29:31 – A. Torchenyuk (S. Barbashev, T. Shingareev)
43:12 – R. Safin (V. Yelakov, G. Nesterov)	1–3

6 min
Penalties
4 min
31
Shots
29

=== Final standings ===
1st place, gold medalist(s)	Russia
2nd place, silver medalist(s)	Kazakhstan
3rd place, bronze medalist(s)	Canada
4	Czech Republic
5	Slovakia
6	Japan
7	United States
8	South Korea
9	Sweden
10	Spain
11	China

=== Scoring leaders ===
List shows the top skaters sorted by points, then goals.

Player	GP	G	A	Pts	+/−	PIM	POS
(Slovakia) Peter Gapa	6	7	5	12	+5	4	F
(Spain) Patricio Fuentes	6	3	8	11	+5	0	F
(Czech Republic) Jan Dalecky	6	6	4	10	+6	6	D
(Czech Republic) David Zachar	6	4	5	9	+6	6	F
(Russia) Artyom Fyodorov	6	3	6	9	+4	4	F
(Russia) Alexander Lebedev	6	1	8	9	+9	4	F
(Canada) Christopher Collins	6	5	3	8	+4	2	F
(Canada) Kevin King	6	5	3	8	+5	8	F
(Russia) Egor Krivchenko	6	5	3	8	+4	0	F
(Spain) Juan Munoz	6	5	3	8	+1	4	F
(Canada) Kruise Reddick	6	5	3	8	+6	4	F
(Russia) Ivan Petrakov	6	4	4	8	+9	4	F
(United States) Joseph Breslin	6	3	5	8	+7	6	F
(Canada) Levko Koper	6	3	5	8	+7	0	F
(Slovakia) Matus Trencan	6	3	5	8	+8	8	F
(Spain) Adrian Ubieto	6	2	6	8	–3	4	D
(United States) Connor Schmidt	6	1	7	8	+4	18	D

GP = Games played; G = Goals; A = Assists; Pts = Points; +/− = Plus/minus; PIM = Penalties in minutes; POS = Position
Source: granada2015.org

=== Leading goaltenders ===
Only the top five goaltenders, based on save percentage, who have played at least 40% of their team's minutes, are included in this list.

Player	TOI	GA	GAA	SA	Sv%	SO
(Canada) Ryan Holfeld	150:46	1	0.40	36	97.22	2
(Russia) Sergey Belov	245:00	3	0.73	107	97.20	2
(Kazakhstan) Mikhail Smolnikov	305:00	10	1.97	149	93.29	0
(Canada) Kristopher Lazaruk	214:14	8	2.24	109	92.66	0
(United States) Matt Cooper	346:08	14	2.43	170	91.76	0

TOI = Time on Ice (minutes:seconds); SA = Shots against; GA = Goals against; GAA = Goals against average; Sv% = Save percentage; SO = Shutouts
Source: granada2015.org

== Women ==
=== Preliminary round ===
Seven participating teams were placed in the following two groups. After playing a round-robin, the teams ranked first and second in each group advanced to the semifinals.

Teams received 3 points for a regulation win, 2 points for an overtime/shootout win and 1 point for an overtime/shootout loss.

All game box scores via wuni15.sportresult.com.

==== Group A ====
Team	Pld	W	OTW	OTL	L	GF	GA	GD	Pts	Qualification
Japan	3	3	0	0	0	16	1	+15	9	Advanced to semifinals
China	3	2	0	0	1	14	2	+12	6	Advanced to semifinals
United States	3	1	0	0	2	11	7	+4	3	5th–7th placement round
Spain	3	0	0	0	3	1	32	−31	0	5th–7th placement round

All times are local (UTC+1).

February 5, 2015; 17:00	United States	1–2 (0–0, 0–0, 1–2)	China	Mulhacen Pavilion, Granada; Attendance: 150

Game reference

Maria Barlow
Goalies
Wang Yuqing
Referee:
Maria Råbye Fuchsel (DEN)
Linesmen:
Liv Andersson (SWE)
Natasa Pagon (SLO)

43:39 – K. Myers (W. Thomas, A. Abromson)	1–0
	1–1	47:00 – Fang X. (Liu Z.)
	1–2	55:27 – Liu Z. (Kong M.)

6 min
Penalties
8 min
28
Shots
24

February 5, 2015; 20:30	Japan	11–0 (4–0, 2–0, 5–0)	Spain	Mulhacen Pavilion, Granada; Attendance: 150

Game reference

Amika Yoshida
Nana Fujimoto
Goalies
Carlota Alvarado
Oihane Tedone
Referee:
Kaisa Ketonen (FIN)
Linesmen:
Bettina Angerer (AUT)
Tereza Streitova (CZE)

7:29 – A. Toko (C. Osawa) (PP)	1–0
12:26 – R. Moritake (A. Ohashi)	2–0
13:58 – C. Osawa (H. Yoneyama)	3–0
19:19 – Y. Notoya (N. Sugisawa)	4–0
34:04 – S. Suzuki (C. Osawa, H. Yoneyama)	5–0
39:45 – Y. Ota (N. Fujimoto)	6–0
45:21 – M. Iwasaki (A. Toko, M. Morii)	7–0
50:13 – S. Koike (H. Yoneyama)	8–0
51:24 – R. Sakamoto (M. Yoshida)	9–0
55:52 – M. Hori (R. Sakamoto) (PP)	10–0
56:13 – H. Yoneyama (R. Sakamoto)	11–0

4 min
Penalties
10 min
86
Shots
7

February 7, 2015; 17:00	United States	1–4 (0–1, 0–0, 1–3)	Japan	Mulhacen Pavilion, Granada; Attendance: 250

Game reference

Caitlin Nosanov
Goalies
Nana Fujimoto
Referee:
Gabriela Mala (CZE)
Linesmen:
Caroline Sauer (GER)
Tereza Streitova (CZE)

	0–1	13:42 – M. Fujimoto (H. Yoneyama) (PP)
48:59 – M. O'Neil (E. Ford) (PP)	1–1
	1–2	56:48 – S. Suzuki (H. Yoneyama, M. Fujimoto) (PP)
	1–3	58:08 – M. Fujimoto (H. Yoneyama) (PP)
	1–4	59:46 – R. Moritake (R. Sakamoto, M. Morii) (PP)

20 min
Penalties
12 min
16
Shots
47

February 7, 2015; 20:30	Spain	0–12 (0–3, 0–6, 0–3)	China	Mulhacen Pavilion, Granada; Attendance: 350

Game reference

Carlota Alvarado
Oihane Tedone
Goalies
Wang Yuqing
Liu Yuchan
Referee:
Elise Harbitz-Rasmussen (NOR)
Linesmen:
Marine Dinant (BEL)
Danielle McGurry (CAN)

0–1	0:45 – Zhang M. (Fang X.)
0–2	6:12 – Liu Z. (Fang X., He X.) (SH)
0–3	16:25 – Kong M. (Fang X., Zhang M.)
0–4	25:31 – Fang X. (Kong M., Du J.)
0–5	33:33 – He X. (Lu S., Zhao Q.) (PP)
0–6	36:08 – Kong M. (Zhang M.)
0–7	36:36 – Liu Z. (Zhang M.)
0–8	37:02 – He X. (Zhang C.)
0–9	37:49 – Zhang M. (Fang X.)
0–10	47:39 – Lu S. (Zhao Q.)
0–11	49:10 – Fang X.
0–12	49:43 – Kong M. (Liu Z.)

6 min
Penalties
12 min
14
Shots
69

February 9, 2015; 17:00	China	0–1 (0–0, 0–0, 0–1)	Japan	Mulhacen Pavilion, Granada; Attendance: 350

Game reference
Wang Yuqing	Goalies	Nana Fujimoto	Referee: Maria Råbye Fuchsel (DEN); Linesmen: Bettina Angerer (AUT); Natasa Pagon (SLO)
0–1 / 47:40 – M. Morii (S. Suzuki) (PP)			Referee: Maria Råbye Fuchsel (DEN); Linesmen: Bettina Angerer (AUT); Natasa Pagon (SLO)
16 min	Penalties	4 min	Referee: Maria Råbye Fuchsel (DEN); Linesmen: Bettina Angerer (AUT); Natasa Pagon (SLO)
14	Shots	56	Referee: Maria Råbye Fuchsel (DEN); Linesmen: Bettina Angerer (AUT); Natasa Pagon (SLO)

February 9, 2015; 20:30	Spain	1–9 (0–5, 1–4, 0–0)	United States	Mulhacen Pavilion, Granada; Attendance: 350

Game reference

Oihane Tedone
Carlota Alvarado
Goalies
Maria Barlow
Referee:
Zuzana Findurova (SVK)
Linesmen:
Marine Dinant (BEL)
Caroline Sauer (GER)

	0–1	1:58 – E. Ford (M. O'Neil)
	0–2	6:58 – C. Labossiere (A. Abromson) (PP)
	0–3	10:03 – M. O'Neil (E. Ford, H. Williams) (PP)
	0–4	11:48 – K. Mooney (P. Harrington, K. Augustine)
	0–5	19:54 – M. O'Neil (K. Levesque)
20:28 – V. Abrisqueta (L. Abrisqueta)	1–5
	1–6	23:55 – H. Williams (A. Abromson, M. Smiddy)
	1–7	29:15 – K. Mooney (P. Harrington) (SH)
	1–8	33:43 – K. Mooney (K. Augustine) (PP)
	1–9	36:56 – M. Smiddy (H. Williams, P. Harrington)

16 min
Penalties
8 min
2
Shots
49

==== Group B ====
Team	Pld	W	OTW	OTL	L	GF	GA	GD	Pts	Qualification
Russia	2	2	0	0	0	15	2	+13	6	Advanced to semifinals
Canada	2	1	0	0	1	8	4	+4	3	Advanced to semifinals
Kazakhstan	2	0	0	0	2	2	19	−17	0	5th–7th placement round

All times are local (UTC+1).

February 4, 2015; 20:30	Canada	7–1 (3–0, 1–0, 3–1)	Kazakhstan	Mulhacen Pavilion, Granada; Attendance: 115

Game reference

Nicole Kesteris
Élodie Rousseau-Sirois
Goalies
Aizhan Raushanova
Referee:
Elise Harbitz-Rasmussen (NOR)
Linesmen:
Marine Dinant (BEL)
Caroline Sauer (GER)

2:44 – M. McHaffie (D. Oddy)	1–0
7:54 – B. Polci (K. Gosling)	2–0
12:29 – J. Fickel (L. Brooker, S. Casorso)	3–0
37:00 – A. Barker (K. Gosling, L. Brooker)	4–0
	4–1	40:50 – M. Ryspek (A. Fux)
45:47 – D. Oddy (K. Gosling, M. Litchfield-Medd) (PP)	5–1
49:33 – B. Lanceleve (K. Gosling, B. Polci)	6–1
54:57 – B. Fouracres	7–1

6 min
Penalties
6 min
55
Shots
10

February 6, 2015; 20:30	Russia	12–1 (4–0, 2–1, 6–0)	Kazakhstan	Mulhacen Pavilion, Granada; Attendance: 250

Game reference

Yulia Leskina
Nadezhda Morozova
Goalies
Aizhan Raushanova
Referee:
Zuzana Findurova (SVK)
Linesmen:
Danielle McGurry (CAN)
Brienne Stewart (USA)

8:25 – O. Sosina (I. Gavrilova) (PP)	1–0
10:23 – Y. Lebedeva (L. Belyakova, I. Gavrilova)	2–0
13:04 – I. Gavrilova (A. Shokhina, Y. Dergachyova) (PP)	3–0
13:37 – A. Vafina (V. Pavlova)	4–0
24:56 – O. Sosina (Y. Dergachyova)	5–0
	5–1	28:59 – Z. Tukhtiyeva
33:49 – Y. Dergachyova (O. Sosina, A. Shokhina)	6–1
40:59 – I. Gavrilova (L. Belyakova)	7–1
43:47 – O. Sosina (Y. Dergachyova) (PP)	8–1
43:53 – I. Gavrilova (Y. Lebedeva)	9–1
53:21 – A. Shokhina (O. Sosina, N. Vorontsova)	10–1
56:32 – A. Vafina (D. Bulatova)	11–1
58:01 – L. Belyakova (Y. Lebedeva, I. Gavrilova) (PP)	12–1

8 min
Penalties
12 min
74
Shots
10

February 8, 2015; 20:30	Canada	1–3 (0–1, 0–1, 1–1)	Russia	Mulhacen Pavilion, Granada; Attendance: 350

Game reference

Élodie Rousseau-Sirois
Goalies
Yulia Leskina
Referee:
Kaisa Ketonen (FIN)
Linesmen:
Liv Andersson (SWE)
Brienne Stewart (USA)

	0–1	8:18 – I. Gavrilova (O. Sosina, A. Shokhina) (PP)
	0–2	23:46 – A. Shokhina (Y. Dergachyova, O. Sosina)
51:59 – B. Lanceleve (A. Normore) (PP)	1–2
	1–3	59:29 – Y. Dergachyova (A. Shokhina) (EN)

8 min
Penalties
18 min
31
Shots
30

=== 5th–7th placement round ===
Team	Pld	W	OTW	OTL	L	GF	GA	GD	Pts
United States	2	1	1	0	0	12	2	+10	5
Kazakhstan	2	1	0	1	0	12	3	+9	4
Spain	2	0	0	0	2	0	19	−19	0

All times are local (UTC+1).

February 10, 2015; 20:30	Kazakhstan	2–3 OT (1–0, 1–1, 0–1) (OT: 0–1)	United States	Mulhacen Pavilion, Granada; Attendance: 120

Game reference

Aizhan Raushanova
Goalies
Caitlin Nosanov
Referee:
Gabriela Mala (CZE)
Linesmen:
Danielle McGurry (CAN)
Tereza Streitova (CZE)

18:53 – Z. Tukhtiyeva (SH)	1–0
25:17 – M. Ryspek	2–0
	2–1	34:57 – K. Augustine (K. Mooney)
	2–2	57:23 – H. Williams
	2–3	62:46 – E. Ford (M. Smiddy, C. Labossiere) (PP)

22 min
Penalties
6 min
25
Shots
44

February 12, 2015; 13:30	Spain	0–10 (0–4, 0–2, 0–4)	Kazakhstan	Mulhacen Pavilion, Granada; Attendance: 60

Game reference

Carlota Alvarado
Goalies
Tatyana Mozhayeva
Referee:
Elise Harbitz-Rasmussen (NOR)
Linesmen:
Caroline Sauer (GER)
Brienne Stewart (USA)

0–1	9:37 – E. Ramazanova (A. Olzhabayeva)
0–2	12:43 – Z. Tukhtiyeva
0–3	14:15 – A. Fux (Z. Tukhtiyeva)
0–4	16:45 – Z. Tukhtiyeva
0–5	24:49 – Z. Tukhtiyeva
0–6	33:46 – A. Fux (Z. Tukhtiyeva)
0–7	43:50 – P. Ashimova (A. Fux, Z. Tukhtiyeva)
0–8	56:58 – M. Ryspek (M. Tursynova)
0–9	59:44 – M. Tursynova (E. Ramazanova)
0–10	59:59 – A. Fux (N. Filimonova, Z. Tukhtiyeva)

12 min
Penalties
8 min
7
Shots
52

February 13, 2015; 13:30	United States	9–0 (2–0, 4–0, 3–0)	Spain	Mulhacen Pavilion, Granada; Attendance: 300

Game reference

Maria Barlow
Caitlin Nosanov
Goalies
Carlota Alvarado
Referee:
Gabriela Malá (CZE)
Linesmen:
Liv Andersson (SWE)
Danielle McGurry (CAN)

8:38 – K. Levesque (E. Ford, M. Korzon)	1–0
12:53 – K. Levesque (M. Korzon)	2–0
21:35 – E. Ford (M. Korzon)	3–0
26:15 – K. Mooney (H. Williams)	4–0
32:01 – K. Augustine	5–0
39:58 – C. Labossiere (K. Myers, A. Abromson)	6–0
45:56 – A. Abromson (K. Mooney)	7–0
56:33 – C. Labossiere (H. Williams)	8–0
59:17 – E. Chalifoux (K. Augustine, W. Thomas)	9–0

6 min
Penalties
0 min
47
Shots
16

=== Playoff round ===
Semifinals
1B	Russia	10
2A	China	0
1A	Japan	2
2B	Canada	5

Gold Medal
1B	Russia	3
2B	Canada	0
Bronze Medal
1A	Japan	3
2A	China	1

All times are local (UTC+1).

==== Semifinals ====
February 11, 2015; 13:30	Japan	2–5 (0–0, 2–3, 0–2)	Canada	Mulhacen Pavilion, Granada; Attendance: 180

Game reference

Nana Fujimoto
Goalies
Nicole Kesteris
Referee:
Zuzana Findurova (SVK)
Linesmen:
Bettina Angerer (AUT)
Brienne Stewart (USA)

	0–1	27:37 – J. Flinton (K. Visser, J. MacKnight)
	0–2	29:35 – M. McHaffie (B. Lanceleve, A. Barker)
34:02 – M. Iwasaki (S. Koike, A. Ohashi)	1–2
	1–3	34:43 – T. Houston (L. Brooker) (SH)
35:09 – C. Osawa (H. Yoneyama) (PP)	2–3
	2–4	57:15 – M. McHaffie (K. Visser, M. Litchfield-Medd)
	2–5	58:56 – A. Normore (J. Kampjes, D. Oddy)

12 min
Penalties
8 min
22
Shots
39

February 11, 2015; 17:00	Russia	10–0 (4–0, 4–0, 2–0)	China	Mulhacen Pavilion, Granada; Attendance: 180

Game reference

Yulia Leskina
Nadezhda Morozova
Goalies
Yang Jiaqi
Wang Yuqing
Referee:
Kaisa Ketonen (FIN)
Linesmen:
Natasa Pagon (SLO)
Tereza Streitova (CZE)

3:05 – A. Goncharenko (O. Sosina)	1–0
3:24 – I. Gavrilova (L. Belyakova)	2–0
5:44 – A. Shokhina (Y. Dergachyova, O. Sosina)	3–0
10:22 – A. Goncharenko (O. Sosina, A. Shokhina) (PP)	4–0
25:50 – D. Bulatova (V. Pavlova, A. Vafina)	5–0
26:28 – A. Goncharenko (O. Sosina, I. Gavrilova) (PP)	6–0
37:15 – L. Belyakova (M. Kirilenko)	7–0
39:19 – A. Shokhina (O. Sosina, M. Batalova) (SH)	8–0
40:35 – A. Shokhina (M. Batalova, Y. Dergachyova)	9–0
57:33 – L. Belyakova (I. Gavrilova)	10–0

16 min
Penalties
10 min
57
Shots
14

==== Bronze medal match ====
February 12, 2015; 17:00	Japan	3–1 (1–1, 1–0, 1–0)	China	Granada Sport Palace, Granada; Attendance: 350

Game reference

Nana Fujimoto
Goalies
Wang Yuqing
Referee:
Maria Råbye Fuchsel (DEN)
Linesmen:
Liv Andersson (SWE)
Marine Dinant (BEL)

10:53 – M. Hori (R. Moritake, M. Morii) (PP)	1–0
	1–1	13:29 – Lu S. (Liu Z., Kong M.) (PP)
27:27 – S. Koike (H. Yoneyama)	2–1
53:17 – R. Moritake (R. Sakamoto, H. Yoneyama)	3–1

33 min
Penalties
10 min
25
Shots
11

==== Gold medal match ====
February 12, 2015; 20:30	Russia	3–0 (0–0, 1–0, 2–0)	Canada	Granada Sport Palace, Granada; Attendance: 2153

Game reference

Yulia Leskina
Goalies
Élodie Rousseau-Sirois
Referee:
Kaisa Ketonen (FIN)
Linesmen:
Bettina Angerer (AUT)
Nataša Pagon (SLO)

22:16 – A. Shokhina (Y. Dergachyova, M. Batalova)	1–0
43:49 – A. Shokhina (O. Sosina, I. Gavrilova) (PP)	2–0
52:06 – V. Pavlova (A. Vafina)	3–0

22 min
Penalties
18 min
34
Shots
40

=== Final standings ===
1st place, gold medalist(s)	Russia
2nd place, silver medalist(s)	Canada
3rd place, bronze medalist(s)	Japan
4	China
5	United States
6	Kazakhstan
7	Spain

=== Scoring leaders ===
List shows the top skaters sorted by points, then goals.

Player	GP	G	A	Pts	+/−	PIM	POS
(Russia) Olga Sosina	4	3	10	13	+10	4	F
(Russia) Anna Shokhina	4	7	5	12	+10	0	F
(Russia) Iya Gavrilova	4	5	6	11	+6	6	F
(Japan) Haruna Yoneyama	5	1	9	10	+4	8	F
(Kazakhstan) Zarina Tukhtiyeva	4	5	4	9	+3	4	F
(Russia) Yelena Dergachyova	4	2	7	9	+8	2	F
(China) Fang Xin	5	3	4	7	+6	4	F
(United States) Kaley Mooney	5	4	2	6	+6	8	F
(Russia) Liudmila Belyakova	4	3	3	6	+7	6	F
(United States) Emily Ford	5	3	3	6	+5	2	F
(China) Kong Minghui	5	3	3	6	+9	6	F
(China) Liu Zhixin	5	3	3	6	+5	4	D
(United States) Hayley Williams	5	2	4	6	+3	4	F
(Kazakhstan) Alena Fux	4	3	2	5	0	2	F
(United States) Katelyn Augustine	5	2	3	5	+4	0	F
(China) Zhang Mengying	5	2	3	5	+6	8	F
(United States) Amanda Abromson	5	1	4	5	+2	0	F
(Japan) Rio Sakamoto	5	1	4	5	+2	4	F

GP = Games played; G = Goals; A = Assists; Pts = Points; +/− = Plus/minus; PIM = Penalties in minutes; POS = Position
Source: granada2015.org

=== Leading goaltenders ===
Only the top six goaltenders, based on save percentage, who have played at least 40% of their team's minutes, are included in this list.

Player	TOI	GA	GAA	SA	Sv%	SO
(Russia) Yulia Leskina	190:55	2	0.63	85	97.65	1
(China) Wang Yuqing	231:01	10	2.60	136	92.65	0
(United States) Caitlin Nosanov	152:35	6	2.36	77	92.21	0
(United States) Maria Barlow	150:07	3	1.20	37	91.89	0
(Japan) Nana Fujimoto	260:00	7	1.62	83	91.57	1
(Canada) Élodie Rousseau-Sirois	147:25	6	2.44	65	90.77	0

TOI = Time on Ice (minutes:seconds); SA = Shots against; GA = Goals against; GAA = Goals against average; Sv% = Save percentage; SO = Shutouts
Source: granada2015.org

== Medalists ==
Event	Gold	Silver	Bronze
Men	Russia (RUS); 1 Gleb Evdokimov; 2 Valerii Vasilyev; 8 Eduard Gimatov; 9 Artyom Gordeyev; 11 Dmitri Akishin; 12 Nikita Cherepanov; 13 Alexander Torchenyuk (C); 14 Mikhail Klimchuk (A); 15 Yegor Alyoshin; 16 Alexander Lebedev; 17 Artyom Fyodorov; 19 Rushan Rafikov (A); 20 Sergey Belov; 21 Evgeny Solovyov; 22 Sergei Barbashev; 23 Kirill Maslov; 24 Egor Krivchenko; 25 Alexander Bolshakov; 26 Ivan Petrakov; 27 Timur Shingareev; 28 Evgeny Viksna; 29 Oleg Li	Kazakhstan (KAZ); 1 Sergey Kudryavtsev; 2 Ilya Gorozhaninov; 3 Viktor Ivashin; 4 Ilya Gulyakov; 5 Alexei Ishmametyev; 6 Daniyar Akhmetov (C); 7 Yulian Popovich; 8 Pavel Zyatkov; 9 German Nesterov; 10 Vladimir Grebenshchikov; 11 Daulet Kenbayev; 12 Alexei Antsiferov; 14 Alexandr Vologodskiy; 16 Renat Safin; 17 Vladislav Yelakov; 18 Alexandr Kurshuk (A); 19 Nursultan Belgibayev (A); 20 Mikhail Smolnikov; 21 Eduard Mazula; 22 Mikhail Kachulin; 23 Ilya Kovzalov; 24 Vyacheslav Fedossenko; 25 Maxim Gryaznov	Canada (CAN); 1 Kristopher Lazaruk; 3 Matthew Delahey (A); 4 Kodie Curran; 5 Luke Paulsen; 6 Kendall McFaull; 7 Mitchell Maxwell; 8 Neil Manning; 9 Elgin Pearce; 10 Christopher Collins; 11 Kruise Reddick (C); 12 Jordan Hickmott; 15 Cody Fowlie; 16 Taylor Foster; 17 Jordan DePape; 19 Levko Koper; 21 Jordan Rowley; 22 Jesse Craige; 23 Craig McCallum; 24 Tyler Fiddler; 25 Kevin King (A); 26 Cody Cartier; 30 Dalyn Flette; 31 Ryan Holfeld
Women	Russia (RUS); 1 Nadezhda Morozova; 2 Angelina Goncharenko (A); 3 Natalia Vorontsova; 7 Yevgenia Dyupina; 8 Iya Gavrilova (C); 9 Alexandra Vafina; 10 Liudmila Belyakova; 12 Maria Pechnikova; 13 Yekaterina Ananina; 14 Diana Bulatova; 15 Valeria Pavlova; 16 Maria Kirilenko; 17 Yekaterina Lebedeva; 18 Olga Sosina (A); 19 Anna Shokhina; 20 Yulia Leskina; 21 Anna Shukina; 22 Maria Batalova; 25 Yelena Silina; 26 Yelena Dergachyova; 27 Elina Mitrofanova; 29 Yekaterina Nikolayeva	Canada (CAN); 1 Élodie Rousseau-Sirois; 2 Bree Polci; 6 Jessica Fickel; 7 Alexa Normore (A); 8 Tess Houston; 10 Sarah Casorso; 11 Katelyn Gosling; 12 Maggie Litchfield-Medd; 13 Julia Flinton; 14 Brittney Fouracres; 17 Keirstin Visser; 19 Laura Brooker (C); 20 Breanna Lanceleve; 21 Morgan McHaffie (A); 22 Ariane Barker; 23 Elizabeth Mantha; 25 Jenny Macknight; 27 Daley Oddy; 29 Jessica Kampjes; 30 Nicole Kesteris	Japan (JPN); 1 Nana Fujimoto; 2 Shiori Koike; 3 Nachi Fujimoto (A); 4 Ayaka Toko; 5 Miyuka Yoshida; 6 Sena Suzuki (A); 7 Mika Hori; 10 Haruna Yoneyama; 11 Mai Morii; 12 Chiho Osawa (C); 13 Moeko Fujimoto; 14 Seika Yuyama; 15 Miyou Touma; 16 Yui Notoya; 17 Yukina Ota; 18 Runa Moritake; 19 Asami Ohashi; 20 Yuuri Komura; 21 Mayu Iwasaki; 22 Nene Sugisawa; 23 Rio Sakamoto; 25 Amika Yoshida

== Medal table ==
Rank	Nation	Gold	Silver	Bronze	Total
1	Russia	2	0	0	2
2	Canada	0	1	1	2
3	Kazakhstan	0	1	0	1
4	Japan	0	0	1	1
Totals (4 entries)		2	2	2	6
