= Yulian =

Yulian is a given name. Notable people with the name include:

- Erry Yulian Triblas Adesta (born 1962), Indonesian academic and Professor
- Yulián Anchico (born 1984), Colombian professional footballer
- Yulian Bachynsky (1870–1940), Ukrainian diplomat
- Yulian Bialozor (1862–1942), Russian general
- Yulian Bromley (1921–1990), Soviet Russian anthropologist who gained an international recognition
- Yulian Butsmaniuk (1885–1967), Ukrainian and Canadian artist
- Yulian-Yurii Dorosh (1909–1982), Ukrainian photographer-artist, cinematographer, ethnographer and local historian
- Yulián Gómez (born 1997), Colombian footballer
- Yulian Iliev (born 2004), Bulgarian footballer
- Yulian Kurtelov (born 1988), prolific goalscorer Bulgarian football player
- Yulian Levashki (born 1981), Bulgarian footballer
- Yulian Manev (born 1966), Bulgarian former footballer
- Yulián Mejía (born 1990), Colombian footballer
- Yulian Nazarak (c. 1893–1916), Ukrainian soldier, poet and painter
- Yulian Panich (1931-2023), Soviet / Russian actor, director, and journalist
- Yulian Pelesh (1843–1896), Ukrainian Greek Catholic hierarch in present-day Ukraine and Poland
- Yulian Petkov (born 1979), retired Bulgarian footballer who last played for Lokomotiv 1929 Sofia
- Yulian Popev (born 1986), Bulgarian footballer
- Yulian Popovich (born 1990), Kazakhstani professional ice hockey forward
- Yulian Radionov (born 1979), retired Bulgarian professional basketball player and coach
- Yulian Radulski (1972–2013), Bulgarian chess Grandmaster
- Yulyan Rusev (1949–1974), Bulgarian swimmer
- Yulian Semyonov (1931–1993), Soviet and Russian writer of spy fiction and detective fiction
- Yulian Shpol (1895–1937), Ukrainian communist poet-futurist, prose writer, playwright
- Yulyan Vasilev (born 1961), Bulgarian swimmer
- Yulian Vergov (born 1970), Bulgarian actor
- Yulian Voronovskyi (1936–2013), Eparchial bishop of Ukrainian Catholic Eparchy of Sambir-Drohobych
- Anggo Yulian (born 1987), Indonesian footballer
- Chen Yulian (born 1960), popular Hong Kong TV actress, especially during the 1980s

== See also ==
- Hayuliang
- Julian (disambiguation)
- Yu Liang
- Yulan (disambiguation)
- Yuli (disambiguation)
- Yulia
- Yuliana
- Yulianna
