= 2019–20 Asia League Ice Hockey season =

2019–20 ALIH season
- League: Asia League Ice Hockey
- Sport: Ice hockey
- Duration: 31 August 2019 – 26 February 2020
- Number of games: 36
- Number of teams: 7

Regular season
- Leaders Flag: PSK Sakhalin
- Season MVP: Mikhail Klimchuk (Sakhalin)
- Top scorer: Kim Ki-sung (Anyang); Shin Sang-hoon (Anyang)

Playoffs
- Finals champions: PSK Sakhalin; Anyang Halla

Asia League Ice Hockey seasons
- ← 2018–19 2020–21(Japan Cup) →

The 2019–20 Asia League Ice Hockey season was the seventeenth season of Asia League Ice Hockey. PSK Sakhalin and Anyang Halla were named joint champions after the league cancelled the Finals due to concerns from the COVID-19 pandemic.

== League business ==
=== Team changes ===
During the 2018–19 season, the Nippon Paper Industries Company announced that they would shut down the Nippon Paper Cranes at the conclusion of the season. During the off-season, the league approved the East Hokkaido Cranes as their replacement.

== Regular season ==
=== Standings ===
Final standings:

Team	GP	W	L	OTL	SOL	GF	GA	Pts
z – PSK Sakhalin	36	25	6	3	0	124	71	82
x – Anyang Halla	36	23	9	0	1	128	68	76
x – Oji Eagles	36	18	12	0	1	114	74	65
x – Daemyung Killer Whales	36	14	18	1	1	86	113	48
East Hokkaido Cranes	36	12	17	2	2	73	104	46
Nikkō IceBucks	36	13	19	2	0	97	111	45
Tohoku Free Blades	36	4	28	2	2	67	148	16

x - clinched playoff spot
z - Leaders Flag (regular season) champion

== Playoffs ==
The league cancelled the final on 26 February 2020 due to concern from the COVID-19 pandemic. The semifinal winners PSK Sakhalin and Anyang Halla were named joint champions

=== Bracket ===
Semifinal
1	Sakhalin	2
4	Daemyung	0
3	Oji	1
2	Anyang	2

Final
1	Sakhalin	0
2	Anyang	0

== Statistics ==
=== Scoring leaders ===
The following players led the league in regular season points at the conclusion of games played on 16 February 2020.

Player	Team	GP	G	A	Pts	+/–	PIM
Shogo Nakajima	Oji Eagles	35	14	32	46	+5	12
Kim Sang-wook	Anyang Halla	36	7	38	45	+4	40
Mikhail Klimchuk	PSK Sakhalin	35	15	28	43	+3	38
Kim Ki-sung	Anyang Halla	36	22	19	41	+4	14
Makuru Furuhashi	Nikkō IceBucks	36	21	18	39	+2	38
Brock Higgs	Daemyung Killer Whales	36	8	30	38	+1	40
Bill Thomas	Anyang Halla	36	14	24	38	+4	12
Kirill Startsev	PSK Sakhalin	35	19	18	37	+3	2
Shin Sang-hoon	Anyang Halla	36	22	14	36	+6	22
Cho Min-ho	Anyang Halla	36	8	27	35	+4	34
