= Yuly =

Yuly is a given name. Notable people with the name include:

- Yuly Aykhenvald (1872–1928), Russian Jewish literary critic who developed a native brand of Aestheticism
- Yuly Conus (1869–1942), Russian violinist and composer
- Yuly Martov (1873–1923), politician and revolutionary, leader of the Mensheviks in Russia
- Yuly Rybakov (born 1946), human rights activist, a former member of the State Duma (1993–2003), a former Chairman of the Subcommittee on Human Rights (2000–2003), the founder of the magazine "Terra incognita", a former political prisoner
- Yuly Shokalsky (1856–1940), Russian oceanographer, cartographer, and geographer

== See also ==
- Yuli (disambiguation)
