= Startsev =

Startsev (Russian: Старцев, from старец, 'starets'), feminine: Startseva, is a Russian surname originated in clergy. Notable people with the surname include:

- Alexey Startsev (1838–1900), Russian merchant and industrialist
- Andrej Startsev (born 1994), Kazakhstani-German football player
- Kirill Startsev (born 1989), Russian ice hockey player
- Maksym Startsev (born 1980), Ukrainian football goalkeeper
- Osip Startsev, Russian architect of 17th–18th centuries
- Yaroslav Startsev (born 1988), Russian sport shooter
- Yevgeniya Startseva (born 1989), Russian volleyball player
- Yuri Startsev (born 1950), Russian naval officer
