= Manev =

Manev (Bulgarian: Манев) is a Bulgarian masculine surname, its feminine counterpart is Maneva. It may refer to

- Emanuil Manev (born 1992), Bulgarian football player
- Evdokiya Maneva (born 1945), Bulgarian politician
- Georgi Manev (1884–1965), Bulgarian physicist
- Ivan Manev (born 1950), Bulgarian sprint canoer
- Kole Manev (born 1941), Macedonian painter and film director
- Milka Maneva (born 1985), Bulgarian weightlifter
- Slavka Maneva (1934–2010), Macedonian writer and poet
- Tzvetana Maneva (born 1944), Bulgarian actress
- Yulian Manev (born 1966), Bulgarian football player
