= Urho Vaakanainen =

Finnish ice hockey player (born 1999)

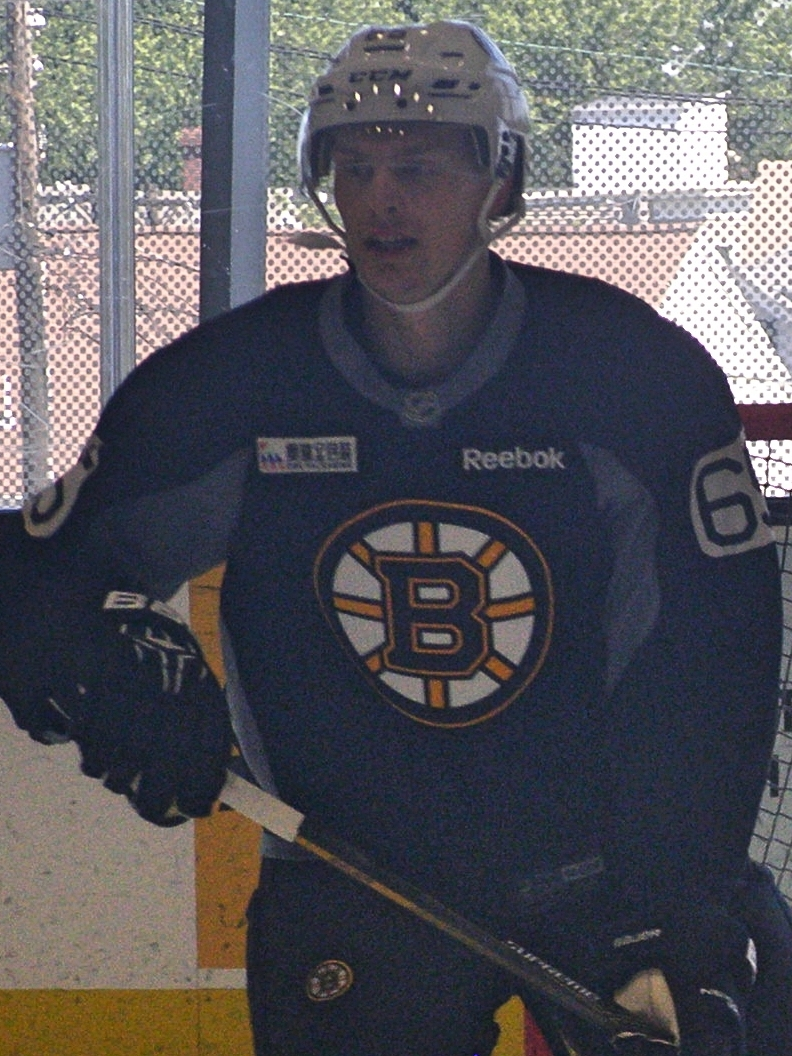
- Vaakanainen with the Boston Bruins in 2017
- Born: 1 January 1999 (age 27) Joensuu, Finland
- Height: 6 ft 2 in (188 cm)
- Weight: 202 lb (92 kg; 14 st 6 lb)
- Position: Defence
- Shoots: Left
- NHL team (P) Cur. team Former teams: New York Rangers; Hartford Wolf Pack (AHL); Espoo Blues; JYP Jyväskylä; SaiPa; Boston Bruins; Anaheim Ducks
- National team: Finland
- NHL draft: 18th overall, 2017; Boston Bruins
- Playing career: 2015–present

Urho Vaakanainen (born 1 January 1999) is a Finnish professional ice hockey player who is a defenceman for the Hartford Wolf Pack of the American Hockey League (AHL) while under contract to the New York Rangers of the National Hockey League (NHL). He was selected 18th overall by the Boston Bruins in the 2017 NHL entry draft. He also played for the Anaheim Ducks.

== Playing career ==
Vaakanainen played as a youth in his native Finland with the Espoo Blues. He made his professional debut with the Espoo Blues in the Liiga during the 2015–16 season, contributing six points in 25 games. On 28 April 2016, Vaakanainen signed a one-year deal with hometown club, JYP Jyväskylä. Vaakanainen earned a regular role within the JYP Jyväskylä blueline in the 2016–17 season, appearing in a career high 41 games, in matching his offensive output with 6 points. He registered three assists in 14 post-season games before losing in seven games in the semi-finals to KalPa. On 5 May 2017, Vaakanainen left JYP Jyväskylä after just one season and signed a one-year contract with his third Liiga club, SaiPa. Vaakanainen's progress was recognised by the Boston Bruins of the National Hockey League (NHL) as he was drafted in the first round, 18th overall, of the 2017 NHL entry draft.

On 13 June 2018, Vaakanainen signed a three-year, entry-level contract with the Bruins. He was assigned to Boston's American Hockey League (AHL) affiliate, the Providence Bruins, to start the 2018–19 season. On 20 October, Vaakanainen was called up for the first time by Boston and made his NHL debut that night in a 2–1 loss to the Vancouver Canucks. He played in two games with Boston, going scoreless before suffering a concussion after being elbowed by Mark Borowiecki of the Ottawa Senators in the second game. Borowiecki received a one-game suspension for the play. He was assigned to Providence and finished the regular season with 30 games played in the AHL, scoring four goals and ten points. Providence made the 2019 Calder Cup playoffs and Vaakanainen appeared in four playoff games, going scoreless. In 2019–20, he began the season with Providence before being recalled by Boston on 11 November. He made his NHL season debut on 12 November in a 5–4 shootout loss to the Florida Panthers, replacing the injured Torey Krug in the lineup. He appeared in five games with Boston, going scoreless and 54 games with Providence, adding five goals and 18 points, before the season was suspended due to the COVID-19 pandemic.

For the pandemic-delayed 2020–21 NHL season, Vaakanainen was loaned to his former team SaiPa of Liiga. He played in two games with SaiPa, scoring one goal before returning to North America. Once the NHL season began in 2021, a series of injuries depleted the Bruins' defence corps and Vaakanainen found himself on the Bruins' top defence pair alongside Charlie McAvoy. He registered his first NHL point in his season debut on 21 February in the NHL Outdoors at Lake Tahoe 7–3 victory over the Philadelphia Flyers. He assisted on David Pastrňák's second period goal. However, as the only member of the Bruins capable of being sent to Providence without passing through waivers he split the season between the NHL and AHL. He appeared in nine games with Boston, tallying two assists, and 11 games with Providence, scoring one goal and three points.

Vaakanainen began the 2021–22 season in Providence but was recalled in January 2022 due to injuries and pandemic-related absences. He was paired with Derek Forbort initially, but also saw time with McAvoy after he returned from injured and fellow call-up Tyler Lewington. He played strong in all roles and coach Bruce Cassidy claimed that he was forcing "difficult decisions when everyone gets healthy." He played in 23 games with Providence, scoring one goal and eight points and 15 games for Boston, registering four assists. On 19 March 2022, Vaakanainen was involved in a trade by the Bruins that sent him along with John Moore and multiple draft selections to the Anaheim Ducks in exchange for Hampus Lindholm and Kodie Curran.

Vaakanainen made his Ducks debut on 29 March in a 3–2 loss to the Dallas Stars. He registered his first point for the Ducks assisting on Kevin Shattenkirk's game-tying goal in the next game on 31 March, also against Dallas. He played the season out on the Ducks blueline, registering two assists through 14 games. On 23 July, Vaakanainen as a restricted free agent was re-signed by the Ducks to a two-year, $1.7 million contract extension. During pre-season for the 2022–23 season, Vaakanainen was hospitalised after he crashed into the end boards in an exhibition game against the San Jose Sharks on 30 September. Missing the first 22 games of the season, Vaakanainen returned to the Ducks after a one-game conditioning stint with their AHL affiliate, the San Diego Gulls. He made just 23 appearances with the Ducks, posting 2 assists, before suffering a season ending injury on 28 January 2023. He was later announced to have had surgery on a torn labrum in his hip on 4 March 2023, with an expected recovery time of six months.

Healthy again, Vaakanainen spent the first couple of games of the 2023–24 season a healthy scratch. However, an injury to Jamie Drysdale saw his playing time increase, slotting in alongside Radko Gudas. He scored his first NHL goal on 25 January 2024 in a 4–3 overtime loss to the Dallas Stars. He previously had three possible goals called back, one with Boston and two with Anaheim. He finished the season playing in 68 games, scoring the one goal and 14 points. In the offseason he signed a one-year contract extension with the Ducks on 1 July. He appeared in five games with the Ducks in the 2024–25 season, registering one assist. He suffered an injury in a game versus the Vegas Golden Knights on 13 November and was placed on injured reserve on 4 December.

On 6 December 2024, Vaakanainen was traded to the New York Rangers, alongside a fourth-round pick in 2025, in exchange for defenceman Jacob Trouba. He made his Rangers debut on 17 December in a game against the Nashville Predators.

== International play ==
Medal record

Representing Finland

Ice hockey

World Championships
Gold medal – first place	2026 Switzerland	

World Junior Championships
Gold medal – first place	2019 Canada	

IIHF U18 Championships
Gold medal – first place	2016 United States	
Silver medal – second place	2017 Slovakia	

Vaakanainen represented the Finnish under-18 national team in the 2016 IIHF World U18 Championships with whom he won gold medals and then finished in second place in 2017 IIHF World U18 Championships. He then played for the Finnish under-20 national team in 2017 World Junior Ice Hockey Championships and 2018 World Junior Ice Hockey Championships where they finished ninth and sixth respectively. Vaakanainen would finally win gold in the 2019 World Junior Ice Hockey Championships, his third time in the tournament as Team Finland was victorious against Team USA in the gold medal round.

== Personal life ==
Vaakanainen was born in Joensuu. His father Harri Vaakanainen played ice hockey in the Finnish 2. Divisioona, which is the fourth highest level in Finland.

== Career statistics ==
=== Regular season and playoffs ===
			Regular season					Playoffs
Season	Team	League	GP	G	A	Pts	PIM	GP	G	A	Pts	PIM
2013–14	Blues	FIN U18	41	8	25	33	48	5	0	3	3	2
2014–15	Blues	FIN U18	—	—	—	—	—	1	0	0	0	0
2014–15	Blues	FIN U20	30	4	8	12	34	9	2	0	2	0
2015–16	Blues	FIN U20	18	2	11	13	8	2	0	0	0	2
2015–16	Blues	Liiga	25	1	5	6	8	—	—	—	—	—
2016–17	JYP	FIN U20	1	0	0	0	0	—	—	—	—	—
2016–17	JYP	Liiga	41	2	4	6	12	14	0	3	3	2
2016–17	JYP-Akatemia	Mestis	3	0	1	1	29	—	—	—	—	—
2017–18	SaiPa	Liiga	43	4	7	11	24	9	0	1	1	0
2018–19	Providence Bruins	AHL	30	4	10	14	10	4	0	0	0	2
2018–19	Boston Bruins	NHL	2	0	0	0	0	—	—	—	—	—
2019–20	Providence Bruins	AHL	54	5	9	14	18	—	—	—	—	—
2019–20	Boston Bruins	NHL	5	0	0	0	0	—	—	—	—	—
2020–21	SaiPa	Liiga	2	1	0	1	2	—	—	—	—	—
2020–21	Boston Bruins	NHL	9	0	2	2	2	—	—	—	—	—
2020–21	Providence Bruins	AHL	11	1	2	3	6	—	—	—	—	—
2021–22	Providence Bruins	AHL	23	1	7	8	20	—	—	—	—	—
2021–22	Boston Bruins	NHL	15	0	4	4	4	—	—	—	—	—
2021–22	Anaheim Ducks	NHL	14	0	2	2	6	—	—	—	—	—
2022–23	San Diego Gulls	AHL	1	0	0	0	0	—	—	—	—	—
2022–23	Anaheim Ducks	NHL	23	0	2	2	0	—	—	—	—	—
2023–24	Anaheim Ducks	NHL	68	1	13	14	26	—	—	—	—	—
2024–25	Anaheim Ducks	NHL	5	0	1	1	2	—	—	—	—	—
2024–25	New York Rangers	NHL	46	2	13	15	16	—	—	—	—	—
2025–26	New York Rangers	NHL	34	0	6	6	14	—	—	—	—	—
Liiga totals			111	8	16	24	46	23	0	4	4	2
NHL totals			221	3	43	46	70	—	—	—	—	—

=== International ===
Year	Team	Event	Result	GP	G	A	Pts	PIM
2014	Finland	U17	4th	6	0	1	1	2
2015	Finland	U17	5th	5	0	0	0	6
2016	Finland	WJC18	1st place, gold medalist(s)	7	1	2	3	6
2016	Finland	IH18	6th	4	0	1	1	2
2017	Finland	WJC	9th	6	1	0	1	4
2017	Finland	WJC18	2nd place, silver medalist(s)	5	3	3	6	2
2018	Finland	WJC	6th	5	0	1	1	2
2019	Finland	WJC	1st place, gold medalist(s)	7	0	4	4	6
2025	Finland	4NF	4th	3	0	0	0	0
2026	Finland	WC	1st place, gold medalist(s)	7	0	2	2	4
Junior totals				45	5	12	17	30
Senior totals				10	0	2	2	4

Awards and achievements
Preceded by Trent Frederic	Boston Bruins first-round draft pick 2017	Succeeded by John Beecher
