= Liudmila Belyakova =

Russian ice hockey player (born 1994)

Liudmila Belyakova Людмила Белякова
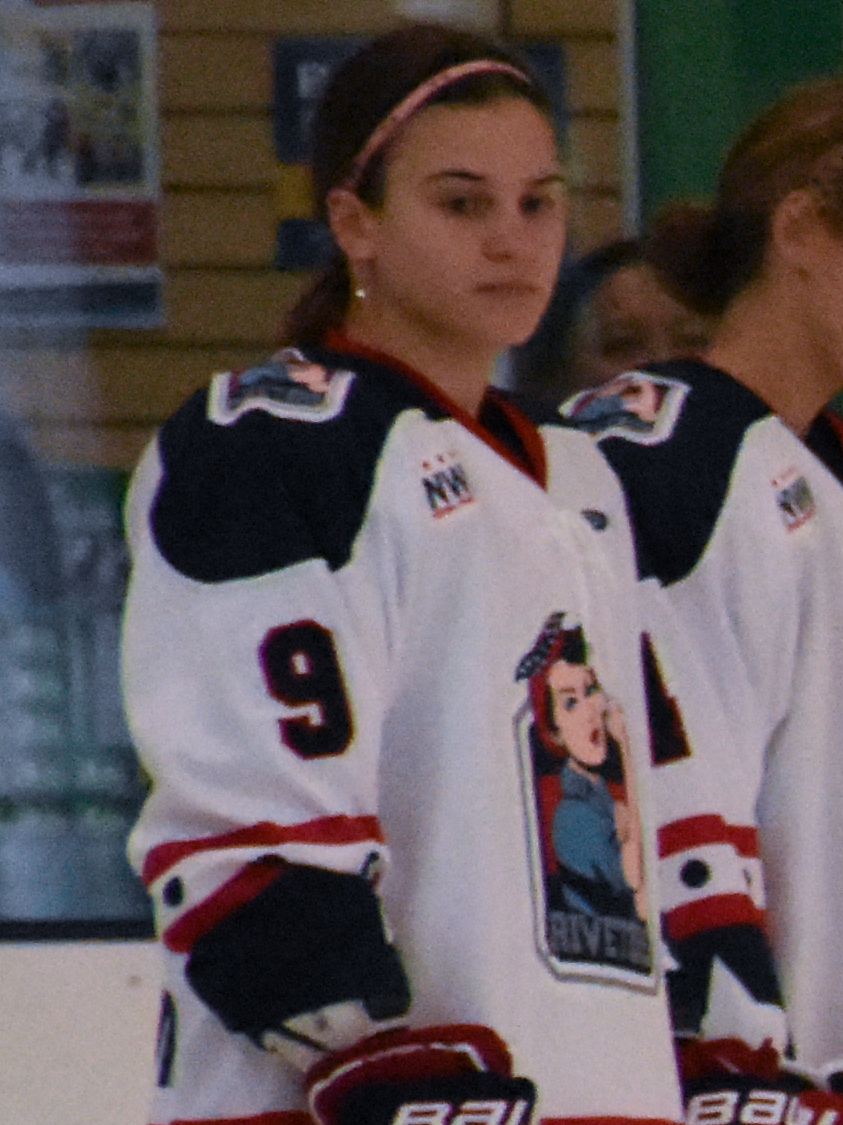
- Belyakova with the Metropolitan Riveters in 2015
- Born: 12 August 1994 (age 32) Moscow, Russia
- Height: 168 cm (5 ft 6 in)
- Weight: 64 kg (141 lb; 10 st 1 lb)
- Position: Forward
- Shoots: Left
- ZhHL team Former teams: HC Tornado; KRS Vanke Rays; New York Riveters
- National team: Russia
- Playing career: 2009–present
- Website: Official website
Medal record
World Championship
Bronze medal – third place	2013 Canada
Bronze medal – third place	2016 Canada
Winter Universiade
Gold medal – first place	2015 Granada	Ice hockey
Gold medal – first place	2017 Astana-Almaty	Ice hockey

Liudmila Viktorovna "Luda" Belyakova (Russian: Людми́ла Ви́кторовна Беляко́ва, romanized: Lyudmíla Víktorovna Belyakóva, also transliterated Lyudmila Belyakova; born 12 August 1994) is a Russian ice hockey forward and member of the Russian national ice hockey team, currently playing in the Zhenskaya Hockey League (ZhHL) with HC Tornado. She is a 'Master of Sports of Russia of International Class,' as named by the Ministry of Sport of the Russian Federation in 2013.

A member of the New York Riveters during the 2015–16 NWHL season, Belyakova was the first Russian to play in the National Women's Hockey League (NWHL).

== Playing career ==
Belyakova started playing ice hockey at age seven and played both forward and defense in her youth.

On 25 July 2015, it was announced that Belyakova had signed a one-year contract with the New York Riveters of the National Women's Hockey League. She joined the roster as one of three Riveters from outside of North America, alongside Janine Weber of the Austrian national team and goaltender Nana Fujimoto of Smile Japan. Belyakova ranked third on the team for scoring with ten points (5 goals+5 assists) in fifteen games played and scored one of the team's four playoff goals.

The Riveters opted not to sign her for the 2016–17 season, and it has been speculated that the language barrier was a major motivator behind the choice. As a free agent, Belyakova returned to Russia to play for her former club, Tornado Dmitrov, in the 2016–17 ZhHL season.

== International play ==
Belyakova was invited to join the Russian national under-18 ice hockey team when she was 12 years old and made her IIHF Women's World U18 Championship debut at the 2010 tournament. Belyakova was named the best player and best scorer of the 2011 IIHF Women's World U18 Championship – Division I. She also participated in the 2012 IIHF Women's World U18 Championship and was named a top-3 player on the Russian team by the coaches of the tournament. In total, she played 28 games for the Russian national U18 team, scoring 30 goals and making 11 assists.

Several weeks after turning 15, Belyakova was invited to join the Russian national team and her debut with the Russian senior national team quickly followed in a match against the Slovak women's national team in Trenčín on 4 September 2009. Representing Russia, she has participated at the IIHF Women's World Championship in 2012, 2013, 2015, 2016, and 2017. She was included in the list of candidates for the Russian national team at the 2010 Winter Olympics in Vancouver, though she was not selected to the squad. She was the first replacement for the Russian team at the 2014 Winter Olympics in Sochi.

As of 2017, Belyakova had played 131 international and showcase games with the Russian national team and had scored 51 goals and 38 assists.

In the women's ice hockey tournament at the 2018 Winter Olympics in Pyeongchang, Belyakova played with the Olympic Athletes from Russia team. She ranked second on the team for points, scoring a goal and two assists. The team placed fourth after a bronze medal game loss to Finland.

== Career statistics ==
=== Regular season and playoffs ===
			Regular season					Playoffs
Season	Team	League	GP	G	A	Pts	PIM	GP	G	A	Pts	PIM
2014-15	HC Tornado	RWHL	24	23	18	41	36	–	–	–	–	–
2015-16	New York Riveters	NWHL	15	5	5	10	20	2	1	0	1	0
2016-17	HC Tornado	ZhHL	35	34	19	53	48	–	–	–	–	–
2017-18	HC Tornado	ZhHL	17	10	5	15	10	–	–	–	–	–
2019-20	HC Tornado	ZhHL	14	12	6	18	14	2	2	1	3	4
ZhHL totals			90	79	48	127	108	2	2	1	3	4

=== International ===
Year	Team	Event	Result	GP	G	A	Pts	PIM
2010	Russia U18	WW18	8th	5	1	2	3	6
2011	Russia U18	WW18 D1	1st	5	11	5	16	4
2012	Russia U18	WW18	7th	6	6	1	7	6
2012	Russia	WW	6th	5	0	0	0	12
2013	Russia	WW	3rd place, bronze medalist(s)	6	1	0	1	4
2015	Russia	WW	4th	6	1	0	1	4
2015	Russia U25	Uni	1st place, gold medalist(s)	4	3	3	6	6
2016	Russia	WW	3rd place, bronze medalist(s)	6	0	0	0	4
2017	Russia U25	Uni	1st place, gold medalist(s)	4	1	8	9	4
2017	Russia	WW	5th	5	1	0	1	2
2018	OAR	OG	4th	6	1	2	3	6
Junior totals				16	18	8	26	16
Senior totals				42	8	13	21	42

== Awards and achievements ==
- Team promoted to Top Division, 2011 IIHF Women's World U18 Championship – Division I
- Master of Sports of Russia of International Class, 2013
- World Championship bronze medal, 2013 and 2016
- Winter Universiade gold medal, 2015 and 2017
- RWHL Champion, 2014–15
- ZhHL Champion, 2016–17
- Gratitude of the President of the Russian Federation, 2015 and 2017
