= Artyom Gordeyev =

Russian ice hockey player

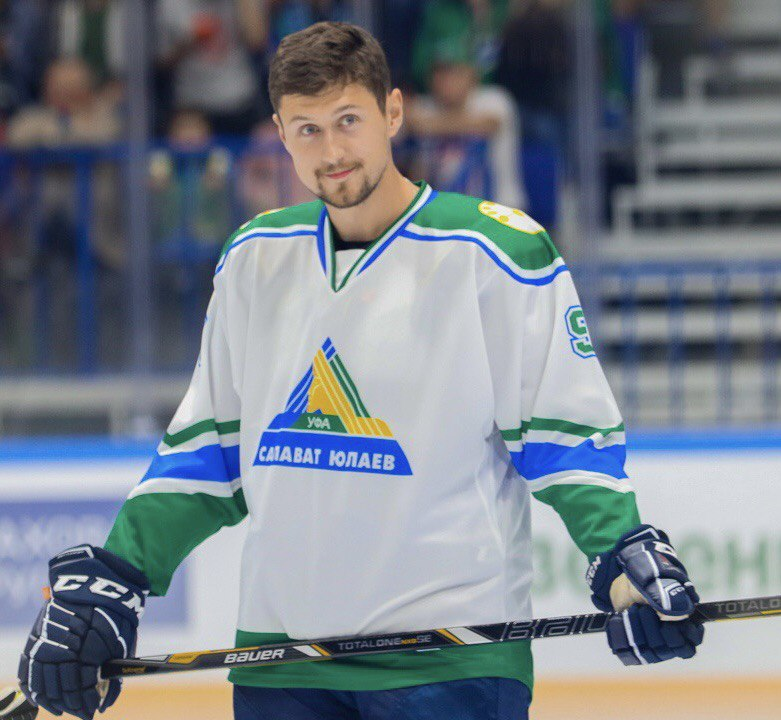
- Artem Gordeev, 2018
- Born: 15 September 1988 (age 38) Ufa, Russian SFSR, Soviet Union
- Height: 187 cm (6 ft 2 in)
- Weight: 94 kg (207 lb; 14 st 11 lb)
- Position: Cente
- Shot: Left
- Played for: Salavat Yulaev Ufa (2004-2005); CSKA Moscow (2005-2006); Salavat Yulaev Ufa (2006-2011); Spartak Moscow (2012); Toros Neftekamsk (2012-2019)
- National team: Russia
- Playing career: 2004–2019
Medal record
Ice hockey
Representing Russia
World Junior Championships
Bronze medal – third place	2008 Czech Republic
Winter Universiade
Gold medal – first place	2015 Spain

Artem Gordeev a.k.a. Artyom Gordeyev (born 15 September 1988) is a Russian former professional ice hockey player.

== Awards and achievements ==
- 2007/2008 Russian Superleague Champion
- 2008 WJC Bronze Medal
- 2010/2011 KHL Gagarin Cup
- 2011/2012, 2012/2013, 2014/2015 SHL Petrov Cup
- 2015 Winter Universiade Gold Medal

== Career statistics ==
Team	League	GP	G	A	Pts	+/-
Salavat Yulaev Ufa	RSL/KHL	87	5	8	13	14
Spartak Moscow	KHL	6	0	1	1	-3
Toros Neftekamsk	SHL	513	87	115	202	134

== International statistics ==
Year	Team	Event	Place	GP	G	A	Pts	PIM	+/-
2008	Russia	WJC	3rd place, bronze medalist(s)	7	2	2	4	2	4
2015	Russia	Universiade	1st place, gold medalist(s)	6	0	2	2	2	6
