= Sun Zehao =

Chinese ice hockey player (born 1995)

- Born: 13 December 1995 (age 30) Harbin, China
- Height: 5 ft 11 in (180 cm)
- Weight: 165 lb (75 kg; 11 st 11 lb)
- Position: Goaltender
- Catches: Left
- KHL team: Kunlun Red Star
- National team: China
- Playing career: 2011–present

Sun Zehao (simplified Chinese: 孙泽浩; traditional Chinese: 孫澤浩; pinyin: Sūn Zéhào, born 13 December 1995) is a Chinese professional ice hockey goaltender who currently plays for Kunlun Red Star in the Kontinental Hockey League (KHL).

== Playing career ==
Sun Zehao began his career playing for Beijing Ice Hockey, in the Chinese Ice Hockey League in 2011. In 2013, he played one game for China Dragon in the Asia League. In 2014, he returned to the Chinese league with the amateur team from Chengde. Prior to the beginning of the 2017–18 season, Sun was signed to an amateur tryout contract with the Vancouver Canucks for two pre-season games in China. The Canucks did not wish to bring a 3rd goalie who would not see action, so they invited Sun to practice with them and be ready to be the back-up goalie in case of injury.

== International play ==
Sun took part in the 2013 IIHF World U18 Championship Division III with China, when he was voted the best goaltender of the tournament, and at the 2015 IIHF World U20 Championship Division III. He also played with the Chinese student team at the 2015 Winter Universiade in Granada, Spain.

Sun first dressed for the men's team at the 2016 IIHF World Championship Division II as the backup goaltender. In 2017, he took over as the starter playing all five games for China. In addition, he represented his country at the 2017 Asian Winter Games in Sapporo, Japan.
