= Evgeny Solovyov =

Russian ice hockey player

- Born: February 14, 1992 (age 33) Norilsk, Russia
- Height: 5 ft 10 in (178 cm)
- Weight: 176 lb (80 kg; 12 st 8 lb)
- Position: Forward
- Shoots: Left
- KHL team Former teams: Khimik Voskresensk; HC Donbass; Metallurg Magnitogorsk; Metallurg Novokuznetsk
- NHL draft: Undrafted
- Playing career: 2012–present

Evgeny Solovyov (born February 14, 1992) is a Russian ice hockey player. He is currently playing with Khimik Voskresensk of the Supreme Hockey League (VHL).

Solovyov previously played in the Kontinental Hockey League with HC Donbass, Metallurg Magnitogorsk and Metallurg Norilsk. He played 61 games in the KHL, scoring 14 goals and 5 assists.
