= Mikhail Klimchuk =

Russian ice hockey player

- Born: April 9, 1988 (age 37) Khabarovsk, Russian SFSR, Soviet Union
- Height: 5 ft 10 in (178 cm)
- Weight: 172 lb (78 kg; 12 st 4 lb)
- Position: Left wing
- Shoots: Left
- ALIH team Former teams: PSK Sakhalin; Amur Khabarovsk
- NHL draft: Undrafted
- Playing career: 2006–present

Mikhail Sergeyevich Klimchuk (Russian: Михаил Сергеевич Климчук; born April 9, 1988) is a Russian professional ice hockey left winger. He is currently playing with PSK Sakhalin of Asia League Ice Hockey (ALIH).

Klimchuk previously played for his hometown team Amur Khabarovsk, playing 18 games during the 2006–07 Russian Superleague season and 44 games during the 2013–14 KHL season.
