= Yoon Sang-won =

South Korean activist (1950–1980)

- 윤상원 (尹祥源)
- Born: August 19, 1950; Gwangju, South Korea
- Died: May 27, 1980 (aged 29); Gwangju, South Korea
- Occupation: activist

Yoon Sang-won (Korean: 윤상원; Hanja: 尹祥源; 19 August 1950 – 27 May 1980) was a South Korean activist and spokesperson for the citizen's militia during the 1980 Gwangju Democratization Movement. Yoon was killed on the last day of the uprising and has since become a symbol in South Korea as a martyr for the democratization movement.

== Biography ==
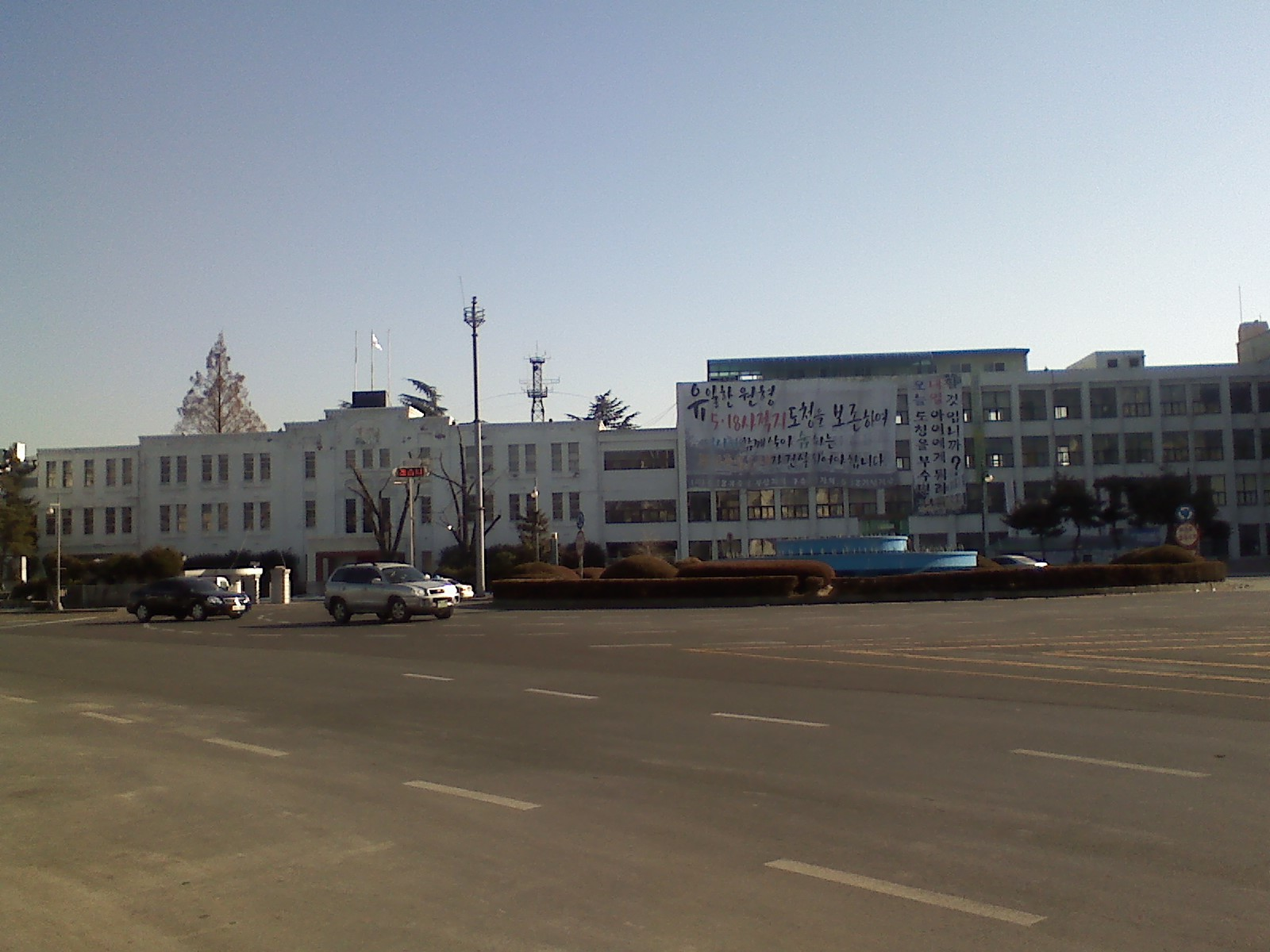
The former South Jeolla Province Provincial Office where Joon and others were killed on May 27, 1980.

Yoon Sang-won was born in Gwangsan District, Gwangju, and attended Chonnam National University in the 1970s. Opposed to the military dictatorship under Park Chung Hee, Yoon quit his job at a bank in 1978 to focus on democracy activism. Yoon worked on organizing labour groups and helped form the National Democratic Workers' League on May 1, 1980. On May 18 of that year, a citizen's uprising against military rule and Coup d'état led by Chun Doo-hwan broke out in Gwangju and Yoon quickly became the leading spokesperson of the organizing Democratic Struggle Committee. As martial law forces violently suppressed the uprising, the armed resistance intensified. Yoon and the remaining militia members took up residence in the main building of the Jeonnam Provincial Office which was turned into the de facto headquarters of the resistance. The protesters were able to fortify and hold the building until May 27 when it was stormed by martial law forces. Yoon was killed in the early morning making a last stand to defend the building. The Gwangju Democratization Movement ended that day, but it was seen as a precursor to the 1987 June Struggle that led to the country's first free and democratic elections later that year within the wider democratization movement known as minjung.
