= Kirill Startsev =

Russian ice hockey player

- Born: September 21, 1989 (age 36) Omsk, Russian SFSR, Soviet Union
- Height: 5 ft 10 in (178 cm)
- Weight: 179 lb (81 kg; 12 st 11 lb)
- Position: Left wing
- Shoots: Right
- ALIH team Former teams: PSK Sakhalin; Avangard Omsk; Metallurg Novokuznetsk; High1
- NHL draft: Undrafted
- Playing career: 2008–present

Kirill Borisovich Startsev (Russian: Кирилл Борисович Старцев; born September 21, 1989) is a Russian professional ice hockey player. He is currently playing with PSK Sakhalin of Asia League Ice Hockey (ALIH).

Startsev previously played two games in the Russian Superleague for Avangard Omsk during the 2007–08 Russian Superleague season and two games in the Kontinental Hockey League for Metallurg Novokuznetsk during the 2013–14 KHL season.
