= Jan Dalecký =

Czech ice hockey player

- Born: 10 March 1990 (age 35); Kladno, Czechoslovakia
- Height: 5 ft 10 in (178 cm)
- Weight: 165 lb (75 kg; 11 st 11 lb)
- Position: Forward
- Shoots: Left
- Oberliga team Former teams: Herner EV 2007; HC Kladno; HC Berounští Medvědi; IHC Písek; HC Slovan Ústí nad Labem; Herning Blue Fox; DEAC; HK Dukla Trenčín
- Playing career: 2011–present

Jan Dalecký (born 10 March 1990) is a Czech professional ice hockey player who currently playing for Herner EV 2007 of the Oberliga.

He played with HC Kladno in the Czech Extraliga during the 2010–11 Czech Extraliga season.

== Career statistics ==
=== Regular season and playoffs ===
			Regular season					Playoffs
Season	Team	League	GP	G	A	Pts	PIM	GP	G	A	Pts	PIM
