= Filip Švaříček =

Czech ice hockey player

- Born: December 30, 1991 (age 33); Prague, Czechoslovakia
- Height: 6 ft 0 in (183 cm)
- Weight: 205 lb (93 kg; 14 st 9 lb)
- Position: Defence
- Shoots: Left
- team Former teams: Free agent HC Sparta Praha
- Playing career: 2011–present

Filip Švaříček (born December 30, 1991) is a Czech professional ice hockey player. He played one game in Czech Extraliga with HC Sparta Praha during the 2010–11 Czech Extraliga postseason.
