= Kodie Curran =

Canadian ice hockey player

- Born: December 18, 1989 (age 36) Calgary, Alberta, Canada
- Height: 6 ft 2 in (188 cm)
- Weight: 201 lb (91 kg; 14 st 5 lb)
- Position: Defence
- Shoots: Left
- team Former teams: Free agent Esbjerg Energy; Storhamar Ishockey; Rögle BK; Metallurg Magnitogorsk; Dinamo Minsk; HC Ambrì-Piotta
- NHL draft: Undrafted
- Playing career: 2015–present

Kodie Curran (born December 18, 1989) is a Canadian professional ice hockey defenceman who is currently an unrestricted free agent. He most recently played with HC Ambrì-Piotta of the National League in Switzerland.

== Playing career ==
Before starting his professional career, Curran played five seasons at the University of Calgary.

Undrafted, Curran made his professional debut at the tail end of the 2014–15 season, signing an initial amateur try-out contract with the Hartford Wolf Pack of the American Hockey League.

He agreed to a one-year contract extension with the Wolf Pack for his rookie season in 2015–16, making just 18 appearances for 4 assists in the AHL, while splitting the season with the Greenville Swamp Rabbits in the ECHL.

With limited North American opportunity, Curran embarked on a European career, winning the Danish cup with Esbjerg Energy in the 2016–17 season. The following season he moved to Storhamar Ishockey in Norway. He was named captain of the team in November when Patrick Thoresen transferred to SKA Saint Petersburg. Storhamar won the league and the cup, and Curran was named player of the year.

Curran moved to his third European club, signing an initial one-year contract with Swedish SHL club, Rögle BK on April 13, 2018. He enjoyed instant success in the SHL, continuing his late development curve in posting 37 points in 49 games from the blueline, to be rewarded with a one-year extension.

In the 2019–20 season, Curran backed up his previous season to have a standout year, contributing with 49 points in just 48 games, earning defenseman of the year and SHL MVP honours.

Attracting interest as a free agent in North America, Curran signed his first NHL contract in agreeing to a two-year contract with the Anaheim Ducks on June 1, 2020.

On March 19, 2022, Curran was traded by the Ducks to the Boston Bruins along with Hampus Lindholm in exchange for a first-round pick in 2022, a second-round pick in 2023, a second-round pick in 2024, Urho Vaakanainen and John Moore.

Unable to make the jump to the NHL, Curran resumed his career abroad in the following 2022–23 season, signing a one-year contract with Russian club, Metallurg Magnitogorsk of the KHL, on September 2, 2022.

Curran continued his tenure in the KHL in the following season by joining Belarusian club, HC Dinamo Minsk, on a one-year contract on July 10, 2023.

== Career statistics ==
			Regular season					Playoffs
Season	Team	League	GP	G	A	Pts	PIM	GP	G	A	Pts	PIM
2006–07	Calgary Canucks	AJHL	43	0	9	9	37	—	—	—	—	—
2007–08	Calgary Canucks	AJHL	55	11	28	39	96	4	1	0	1	19
2008–09	Calgary Canucks	AJHL	58	9	30	39	93	4	1	6	7	4
2009–10	Calgary Canucks	AJHL	12	3	12	15	42	—	—	—	—	—
2009–10	Spruce Grove Saints	AJHL	35	7	26	33	121	15	3	8	11	27
2010–11	University of Calgary	CWUAA	14	1	9	10	23	5	2	0	2	0
2011–12	University of Calgary	CWUAA	10	1	7	8	18	8	1	0	1	6
2012–13	University of Calgary	CWUAA	26	3	19	22	22	5	1	3	4	4
2013–14	University of Calgary	CWUAA	23	4	21	25	24	5	0	0	0	4
2014–15	University of Calgary	CWUAA	23	8	16	24	28	—	—	—	—	—
2014–15	Hartford Wolf Pack	AHL	2	0	1	1	0	—	—	—	—	—
2015–16	Greenville Swamp Rabbits	ECHL	45	7	18	25	37	—	—	—	—	—
2015–16	Hartford Wolf Pack	AHL	18	0	4	4	18	—	—	—	—	—
2016–17	Esbjerg Energy	Denmark	45	10	23	33	65	18	6	11	17	18
2017–18	Storhamar Ishockey	GET	38	12	32	44	65	14	12	17	29	12
2018–19	Rögle BK	SHL	49	12	25	37	24	2	0	1	1	2
2019–20	Rögle BK	SHL	48	12	37	49	67	—	—	—	—	—
2020–21	San Diego Gulls	AHL	24	6	7	13	15	—	—	—	—	—
2021–22	San Diego Gulls	AHL	37	1	15	16	29	—	—	—	—	—
2021–22	Providence Bruins	AHL	11	0	0	0	6	—	—	—	—	—
2022–23	Metallurg Magnitogorsk	KHL	57	6	16	22	21	11	0	5	5	6
2023–24	Dinamo Minsk	KHL	65	8	20	28	33	6	0	1	1	4
2024–25	HC Ambrì-Piotta	NL	35	2	6	8	12	1	0	0	0	0
SHL totals			97	24	62	86	91	2	0	1	1	2
KHL totals			122	14	36	50	54	17	0	6	6	10

== Awards and honours ==
Award	Year
College
West First All-Star Team	2014, 2015
Metal
All-Star Team	2017
Champions (Storhamar Dragons)	2017
GET
All-Star Team	2018
Player of the Year	2018
Playoffs MVP	2018
Champions (Esbjerg Energy)	2018
SHL
Salming Trophy	2020
Guldhjälmen (MVP)	2020
