= German Nesterov =

- Born: 31 August 1991 (age 33); Nizhnekamsk, Russian SFSR, Soviet Union
- Height: 1.90 m (6 ft 3 in)
- Weight: 95 kg (209 lb; 14 st 13 lb)
- Position: Forward
- Shoots: Left
- VHL team Former teams: Rubin Tyumen; Saryarka Karagandy; HK Gomel; Dinamo-Molodechno; HC Vityaz
- National team: Belarus
- Playing career: 2012–present

German Vyacheslavovich Nesterov (Russian: Герман Вячеславович Нестеров; born 31 August 1991) is a Belarusian ice hockey player for Rubin Tyumen in the Supreme Hockey League (VHL) and the Belarusian national team.

He represented Belarus at the 2021 IIHF World Championship.
