= Eduard Gimatov =

Russian ice hockey player

- Born: 22 January 1994 (age 31) Ufa, Russia
- Height: 5 ft 11 in (180 cm)
- Weight: 185 lb (84 kg; 13 st 3 lb)
- Position: Forward
- Shoots: Right
- VHL team Former teams: Neftyanik Almetievsk; Avtomobilist Yekaterinburg; Severstal Cherepovets; Neftekhimik Nizhnekamsk; Salavat Yulaev Ufa; Spartak Moscow
- Playing career: 2012–present

Eduard Gimatov (born 22 January 1994) is a Russian professional ice hockey player. He is currently playing with Neftyanik Almetievsk of the Supreme Hockey League (VHL).

Gimatov made his Kontinental Hockey League (KHL) debut playing with Avtomobilist Yekaterinburg during the 2012–13 KHL season.
