= Sarah Casorso =

Canadian ice hockey player

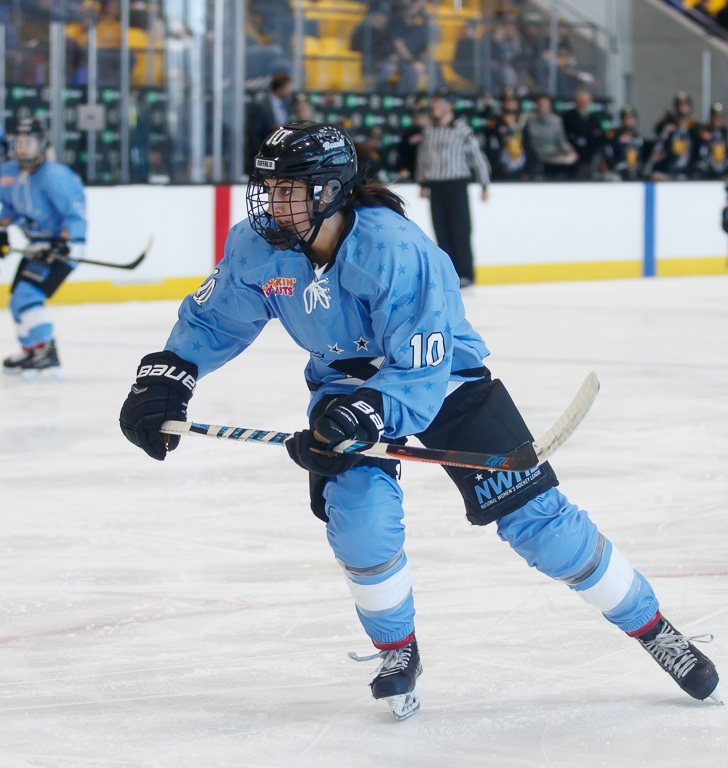
- Sarah Casorso playing for the Buffalo Beauts in 2018
- Born: March 22, 1992 (age 33)
- Height: 5 ft 7 in (170 cm)
- Position: Defender
- NWHL team Former teams: Buffalo Beauts; Vienna Sabres
- Playing career: 2015–2018

Sarah Casorso is a professional women's hockey player with the Buffalo Beauts of the National Women's Hockey League. She was a member of the Canadian National team that won Silver at the 2015 Winter Universiade in Granada, Spain, and is an alumna of the University of British Columbia Thunderbirds program.

== Playing career ==
A native of Kelowna, British Columbia, Casorso is a product of the Kelowna Minor hockey Association. In 2008 and 2009 she was a member of team British Columbia, competing at two U-18 National Championships.

In 2009, Casorso committed to the University of British Columbia (UBC). In her five years at UBC, she became the program's highest-ever scoring defenceman with 24 goals and 57 assists (81 pts) in 137 games played. In her last season (2014–2015), she captained the Thunderbirds to their best league finish at second place in the Canada West standings. Capping the season with 21 points in 23 games, she would become the highest scoring defenceman in the country, earning herself nominations for the 2015 UBC female athlete of the year and the 2015 Kelowna female athlete of the year.

In 2015, Casorso was a member of the Canadian national team that competed at the World Universiade in Granada, Spain, earning a silver medal.

Upon graduating, Casorso signed a one-year professional contract with the Vienna Sabres Hockey Organization of the Elite Women's Hockey League (EWHL). In 19 games she recorded 14 goals and 19 assist for 33 points. The Sabres won the EWHL league title and the EWHL Super Cup.

In June 2016, Casorso signed a contract with the Buffalo Beauts of the National Women's Hockey League (NWHL).

In January 2018, she retired from professional hockey in order to focus on personal career endeavors.
