= Erry Yulian Triblas Adesta =

Indonesian academic and a Professor (born 1962)

Erry Yulian Triblas Adesta (born July 13, 1962), is an Indonesian academic who was a former professor at International Islamic University Malaysia (IIUM). He is currently a Professor and Vice Rector for Planning, Development and Cooperation at Universitas Indo Global Mandiri. He is a former Dean of the Faculty of Engineering and was the Deputy Dean of Postgraduate & Research at the Faculty of Engineering, IIUM. In Indonesia, he has been active as an Assessor for National Accreditation Council (Badan Akreditasi Nasional - Perguruan Tinggi/BAN-PT) since 2003, and reviewer for Competitive Funding Program (Hibah Bersaing) - Indonesian Higher Education Council since 2006. His areas of expertise include manufacturing engineering, manufacturing cost, supply chain management, project management, and value engineering.

== Early life and marriage ==
Adesta was born in Palembang, South Sumatra, Indonesia on July 13, 1962. He is the first son, with seven siblings, of Edward Jarjis bin Sutan Malihan and Roslaini binti Anwar Hamzah. His father was a teacher and his mother was a nurse in Sungai Gerong, South Sumatra. He completed his high-school education at Sekolah Menengah Atas Xaverius I at Palembang by 1981. He later enrolled to Mechanical Engineering Department at the Faculty of Engineering, Sriwijaya University, before he later left the program after the first year of the enrollment itself.

Adesta married Tritayana binti M. Yasin in 1987 while he was pursuing his study at Huddersfield, UK. He has three sons, all of whom were born in UK.

== Education ==
Adesta was a student at the Department of Mechanical Engineering, Faculty of Engineering, Sriwijaya University from 1982. He later he moved to Polytechnic University of Sriwijaya and graduated with a Diploma in Mechanical Engineering.

Adesta pursued further study in the United Kingdom from 1985, under a scholarship from the World Bank 2nd Polytechnic Education Development Project provided by the Government of the Republic of Indonesia. He enrolled for BEng (Hons) in Mechanical and Production Engineering at the Polytechnic of Huddersfield at West Yorkshire, England. He later completed his master's degree in Integrated Manufacturing Systems under a scholarship from Foreign & Commonwealth Office in 1991 at the University of Birmingham. His PhD in Manufacturing Systems Engineering in 1998 was conducted under a scholarship from the Engineering Education Development Project from the Ministry of National Education at the University of Huddersfield.

== Career ==
In 1985, Adesta was a Master Teacher at PEDC-ITB. He left the academic world for about two years to work at Indonesian Aerospace Company (PT Dirgantara Indonesia). He returned to academia after he completed his master's degree. He was nominated in the elections as a rector candidate at Tarumanagara University in 2007. He did not proceed to the position, and for rector of University of Indonesia in 2014.

Adesta lives in Malaysia and is a lecturer at International Islamic University Malaysia (IIUM), Malaysia, and Gunadarma University, Indonesia. He holds the academic position at the Department of Manufacturing & Materials Engineering, Faculty of Engineering, IIUM. He was promoted to Full Professor in 2011.

In June 2008, he was assigned as the Head of Department of Manufacturing & Materials Engineering position, where he completed it by June 2012. An immediate administrative position followed in July 2012, as the Deputy Dean for Postgraduate & Research at the Faculty of Engineering, finishing in December 2016. Adesta became Acting Dean of the Faculty of Engineering in January 2017.

Adesta is Chairman for Agile and Sustainable Manufacturing Research Unit (ASMARU), at the Department of Manufacturing & Materials Engineering.

=== Other activities ===
Together with his colleagues, Afzeri, Ari Legowo, Rifki Muhida, Riza Muhida, Ahmad Unggul Priantoro and Talib Hassan Hashim, Adesta initiated the Indonesian Lecturer and Researcher Association in Malaysia (ILRAM), an organization for Indonesian lecturers and researchers with over 300 members and a journal named International Journal of Science Engineering and Technology (IJSET).

Adesta has given some visiting lectures at Sultan Agung Islamic University, Indonesia, where he delivered his speech on the significant changes in education to embrace the ASEAN Economic Community and integration in 2015 and was a keynote speaker on the International Conference on Green Development organized by University of Jambi in October 2016.
