= Kazuki Kawamura =

Japanese middle-distance runner

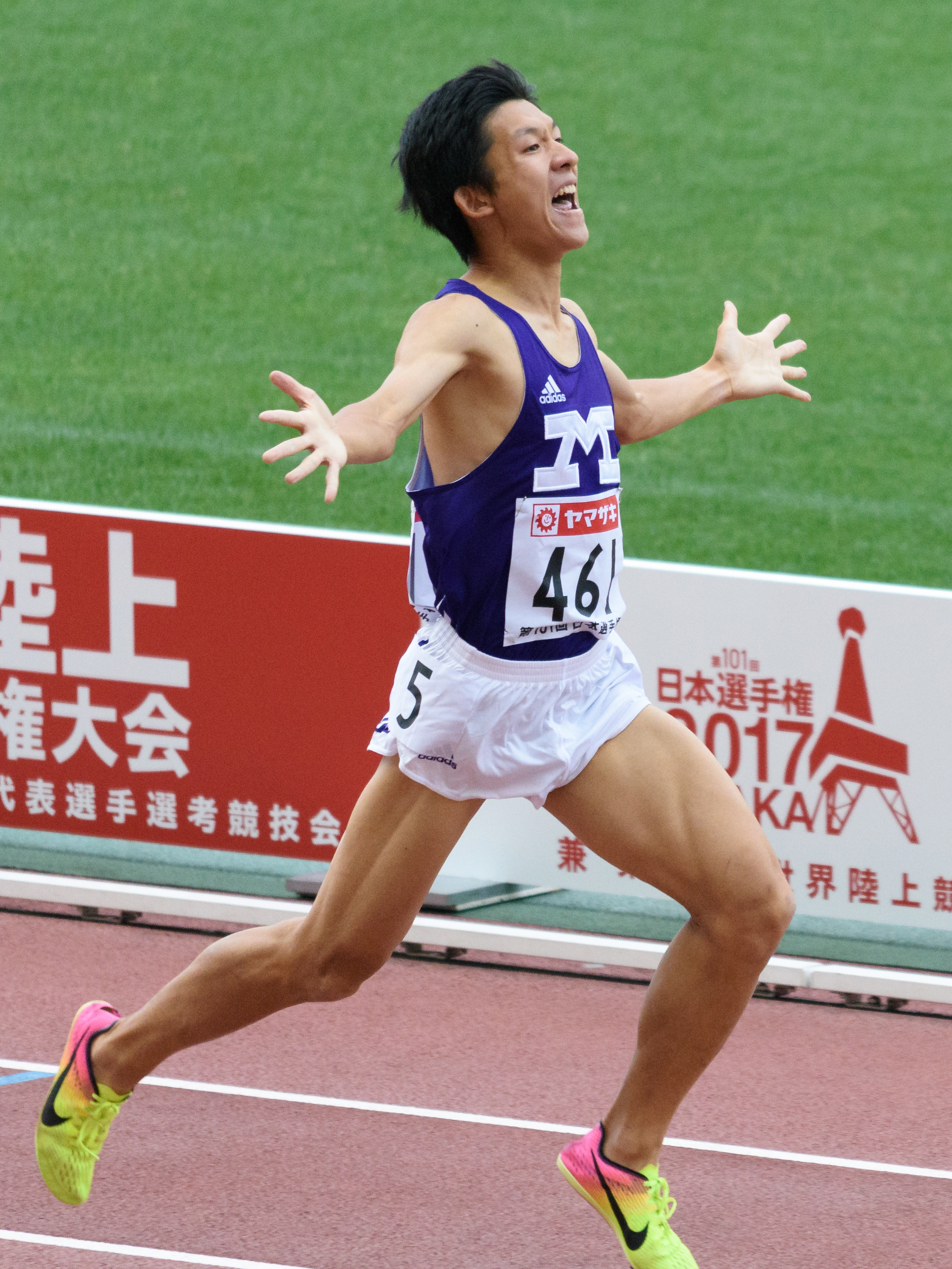

Personal information
- Born: 13 November 1997 (age 28) Ikeda, Gifu, Japan
- Height: 1.68 m (5 ft 6 in)

Sport
- Sport: Athletics
- Events: 1500 metres; 5000 metres
- University team: Meiji University

Kazuki Kawamura (河村 一輝, Kawamura Kazuki, born 13 November 1997) is a Japanese middle and long-distance runner, who specializes in the 1500 metres. He is the Japanese national record holder for the 1500 metres, with a time of 3:35.42. He also won the event at the 2021 and 2023 Japan Championships in Athletics.

== Personal bests ==
Outdoor

- 1500 metres – 3:35.42 (Chitose 2021) NR
  - Indoor – 3:42.07 (Ghent 2023)
- 3000 metres – 7:53.95 (Hiroshima 2021)
- 5000 metres – 13:32.36 (Kyoto 2021)
- 10,000 metres – 28:34.80 (Tajimi 2020)
