= Marek Marušiak =

Slovak ice hockey player

- Born: 19 September 1990 (age 34); Poprad, Slovakia
- Height: 6 ft 0 in (183 cm)
- Weight: 183 lb (83 kg; 13 st 1 lb)
- Position: Forward
- Shot: Left
- Slovak Extraliga team: HK SKP Poprad
- Playing career: 2010–2016

Marek Marušiak (born 19 September 1990) is a Slovak professional ice hockey player. Marušiak played with HK SKP Poprad in the Slovak Extraliga during the 2010–11 season and with the Paneuropa Kings of the European University Hockey League (EUHL) from the 2013-14 season to the 2015–16 season.
