= Oleg Li =

Russian ice hockey player (born 1991)

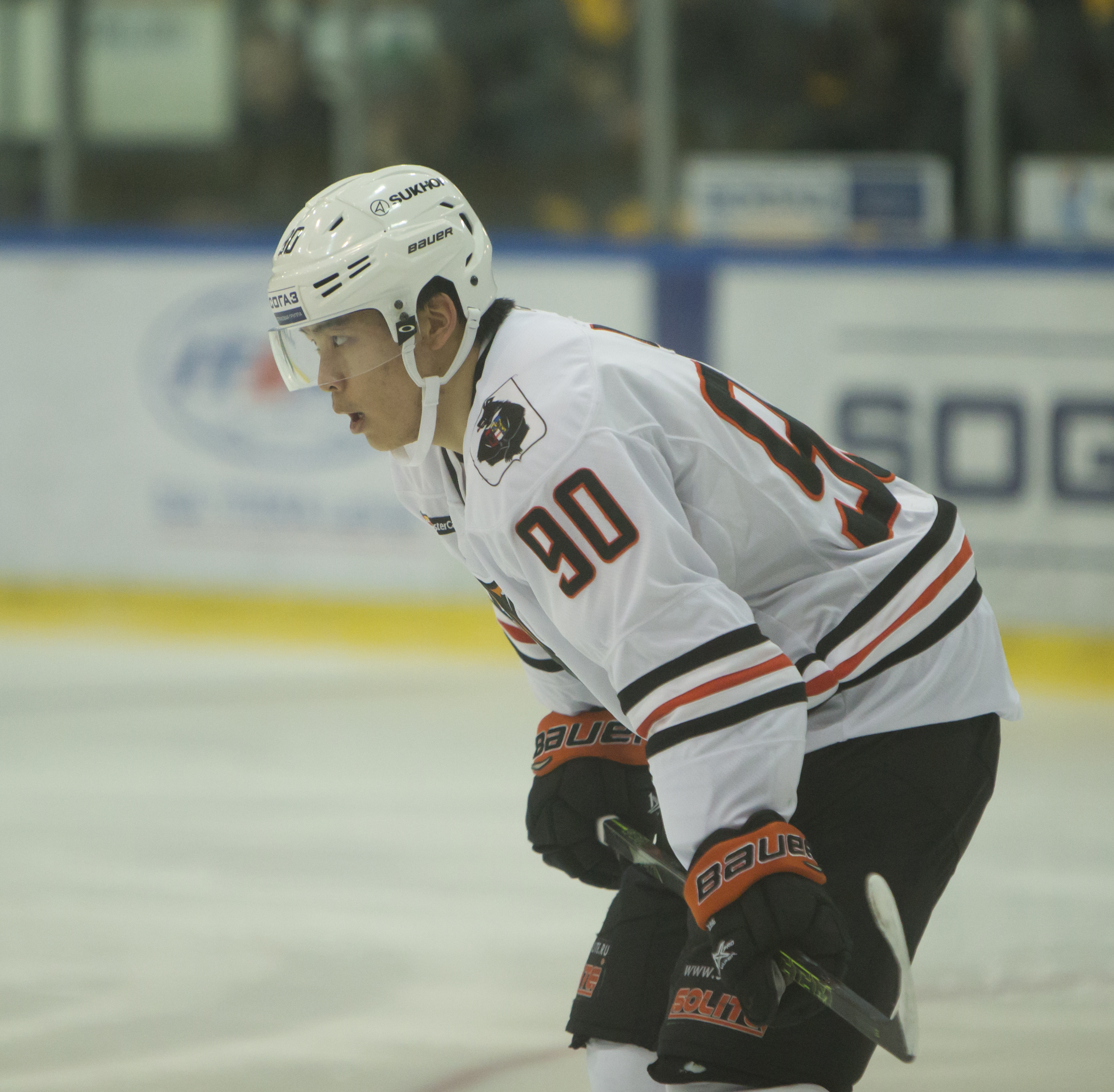
- Born: February 28, 1991 (age 34) Volgograd, Russian SFSR, Soviet Union
- Height: 5 ft 11 in (180 cm)
- Weight: 201 lb (91 kg; 14 st 5 lb)
- Position: Left wing
- Shoots: Left
- KHL team Former teams: Amur Khabarovsk; Atlant Moscow Oblast; Admiral Vladivostok; SKA Saint Petersburg; Ak Bars Kazan; Sibir Novosibirsk; Avtomobilist Yekaterinburg; Torpedo Nizhny Novgorod
- NHL draft: Undrafted
- Playing career: 2007–present

Oleg Olegovich Li (Russian: Олег Олегович Ли; born February 28, 1991) is a Russian professional ice hockey forward who currently plays for Amur Khabarovsk in the Kontinental Hockey League (KHL).

== Playing career ==
Earlier in his career, Li competed in the KHL for several teams, including Atlant Moscow Oblast, Admiral Vladivostok, Amur Khabarovsk, SKA Saint Petersburg, and Ak Bars Kazan. On May 1, 2018, Amur traded him to SKA Saint Petersburg in return for financial compensation.

In the 2019–20 season, after playing just one game for SKA, Li was dealt to Ak Bars Kazan for financial considerations on October 18, 2019. He went on to play 29 games with Ak Bars, tallying three goals and a total of nine points, before concluding the season in the VHL with Bars Kazan.

On May 1, 2020, Li continued his career in the Kontinental Hockey League (KHL) by signing a one-year contract with HC Sibir Novosibirsk as a free agent.

Following his two-year stint with Sibir Novosibirsk, Li extended his KHL career by signing a two-year deal with Avtomobilist Yekaterinburg on May 3, 2022.

In the final year of his contract with Avtomobilist during the 2023–24 season, Li recorded only 2 goals and 3 points across 31 regular-season games. He was released from his contract and went on to sign with Torpedo Nizhny Novgorod for the rest of the season on December 4, 2023.

As a free agent, Li decided to leave Torpedo and return to his former club, Amur Khabarovsk. On July 2, 2024, he signed a two-year contract with Amur, marking a homecoming to the team where he previously played.
