= Michal Gutwald =

Czech ice hockey defenceman

- Born: 17 June 1993 (age 31); Slaný, Czech Republic
- Height: 6 ft 3 in (191 cm)
- Weight: 220 lb (100 kg; 15 st 10 lb)
- Position: Defence
- Shoots: Left
- Ligue Magnus team Former teams: Anglet Hormadi Élite; HC Kladno; MsHK Žilina; Glasgow Clan; Fife Flyers; Cracovia Kraków
- Playing career: 2012–present

Michal Gutwald (born 17 June 1993) is a Czech professional ice hockey defenceman who plays for Anglet Hormadi Élite in the French Ligue Magnus. He previously played with Cracovia Kraków in the Polska Hokej Liga.

== Career ==
Gutwald began his career with HC Kladno and made his debut for the senior team during the 2011–12 Czech Extraliga season where he played one game. After spending the following season with HC 07 Detva of the Tipsport liga in Slovakia, Gutwald returned to Kladno in 2013.

Gutwald spent the 2016–17 season in Slovakia, playing in the Tipsport Liga for MsHK Žilina during the regular season, and in the 1. Liga for HK Dukla Michalovce during the playoffs.

On 1 November 2017 Gutwald moved to the United Kingdom to sign for the Braehead Clan based in Glasgow, Scotland.

After two seasons with the Clan, he moved to fellow Scottish team the Fife Flyers on 8 August 2019.

In August 2020, Gutwald moved to Polish side Cracovia Kraków. In 2021, Gutwald moved to French Ligue Magnus side Anglet Hormadi Élite.
