= Daulet Kenbayev =

Kazakhstani ice hockey player

- Born: July 12, 1992 (age 32); Oskemen, Kazakhstan
- Height: 6 ft 1 in (185 cm)
- Weight: 172 lb (78 kg; 12 st 4 lb)
- Position: Center
- Shoots: Left
- KHL team (P) Cur. team: Barys Astana; Nomad Astana (KAZ)
- National team: Kazakhstan
- Playing career: 2011–present

Daulet Sarsenuly Kenbayev (Kazakh: Дәулет Сәрсенұлы Кенбаев, Däulet Särsenūly Kenbaev; born July 12, 1992) is a Kazakhstani professional ice hockey center currently playing for the Barys Astana in the Kontinental Hockey League (KHL).

== Career statistics ==
=== Regular season ===
| | | | Regular season | | | | | Playoffs |
| Season | Team | League | GP | G | A | Pts | PIM | GP | G | A | Pts | PIM |
|---|---|---|---|---|---|---|---|---|---|---|---|---|
| 2011-12 | Snezhnye Barsy Astana | MHL | 60 | 10 | 17 | 27 | 10 | 11 | 1 | 1 | 2 | 2 |
| 2012-13 | Snezhnye Barsy Astana | MHL | 49 | 7 | 14 | 21 | 12 | — | — | — | — | — |
| MHL totals | | | 109 | 17 | 31 | 48 | 22 | — | — | — | — | — |

=== International ===
| Year | Team | Event | GP | G | A | Pts | PIM |
|---|---|---|---|---|---|---|---|
| 2009 | Kazakhstan Jr. | WJC U18 D1 | 5 | 0 | 2 | 2 | 2 |
| 2010 | Kazakhstan Jr. | WJC U18 D1 | 5 | 0 | 1 | 1 | 2 |
| 2010 | Kazakhstan Jr. | WJC D1 | 5 | 0 | 1 | 1 | 0 |
| 2011 | Kazakhstan Jr. | WJC D1 | 5 | 0 | 1 | 1 | 0 |
| 2012 | Kazakhstan Jr. | WJC D1B | 5 | 1 | 1 | 2 | 0 |
| Junior Int' totals | | | 25 | 1 | 6 | 7 | 4 |
