= Yuli =

Yuli may refer to:

== People ==
- Yuli Berkovich a scientist who did experiments with seed germination in zero gravity in the International Space Station
- Yuli Burkin, a Russian writer (sci-fi) and musician
- Yuli Daniel, a Soviet dissident writer, poet, translator, political prisoner and gulag survivor
- Yuli Dunsky, a Soviet scriptwriter
- Yuli Gurriel, a Cuban professional baseball infielder
- Yuli Gusman, a Soviet, Russian and Azerbaijani film director and actor
- Yuli Raizman, a Soviet Russian film director and screenwriter
- Yuli Tamir, an Israeli academic, politician and former Minister of Immigrant Absorption
- Yuli Mikhailovich Vorontsov a Russian diplomat and President of International Centre of the Roerichs
- Yuli Edelstein, a Russian-Israeli politician and former Minister of Immigrant Absorption
- Zheng Yuli, a retired female badminton player from China
- Nickname of the Cuban-British ballet dancer and director Carlos Acosta

== Places ==
- Yuli County (尉犁县), of Bayingolin Mongol Autonomous Prefecture, Xinjiang, China
- Yuli (尉犁), the former name of Korla in Bayingolin Mongol Autonomous Prefecture, Xinjiang, China
- Yuli, Rushan (育黎镇), town in Rushan City, Shandong, China
- Yuli, Wulian County (于里镇), town in Wulian County, Shandong, China
- Yuli, Hualien (玉里鎮), township in Hualien County, Taiwan

== Other ==
- Chongqing−Lichuan railway, also known as Yuli Railway, in Chongqing and Hubei, PR China
- Yuli (race), a fictional race from the sci-fi Star Control computer game series
- Yuli: The Carlos Acosta Story, 2018 biopic of the Cuban dancer
- Yuli (2018 film), a Peruvian science fiction action film
