= PSK Sakhalin =

- City: Yuzhno-Sakhalinsk, Sakhalin Oblast, Russia
- League: Asia League Ice Hockey (2014–2020)
- Founded: 2013; 13 years ago
- Operated: 2013–2022
- Home arena: Ice Palace Kristall
- Colours: Blue, light blue, white
- Website: oneteamsakhalin.com
Home colours	Away colours

PSK Sakhalin (Russian: ПСК «Сахалин»), formerly known as HK Sakhalin and Sakhalin Sea Lions, was an ice hockey team based in Yuzhno-Sakhalinsk, Sakhalin Oblast, Russia. Sakhalin joined the Asia League Ice Hockey (ALIH) in 2014 and played in the competition until 2022, when the ALIH voted to remove the team in protest of the Russian invasion of Ukraine.

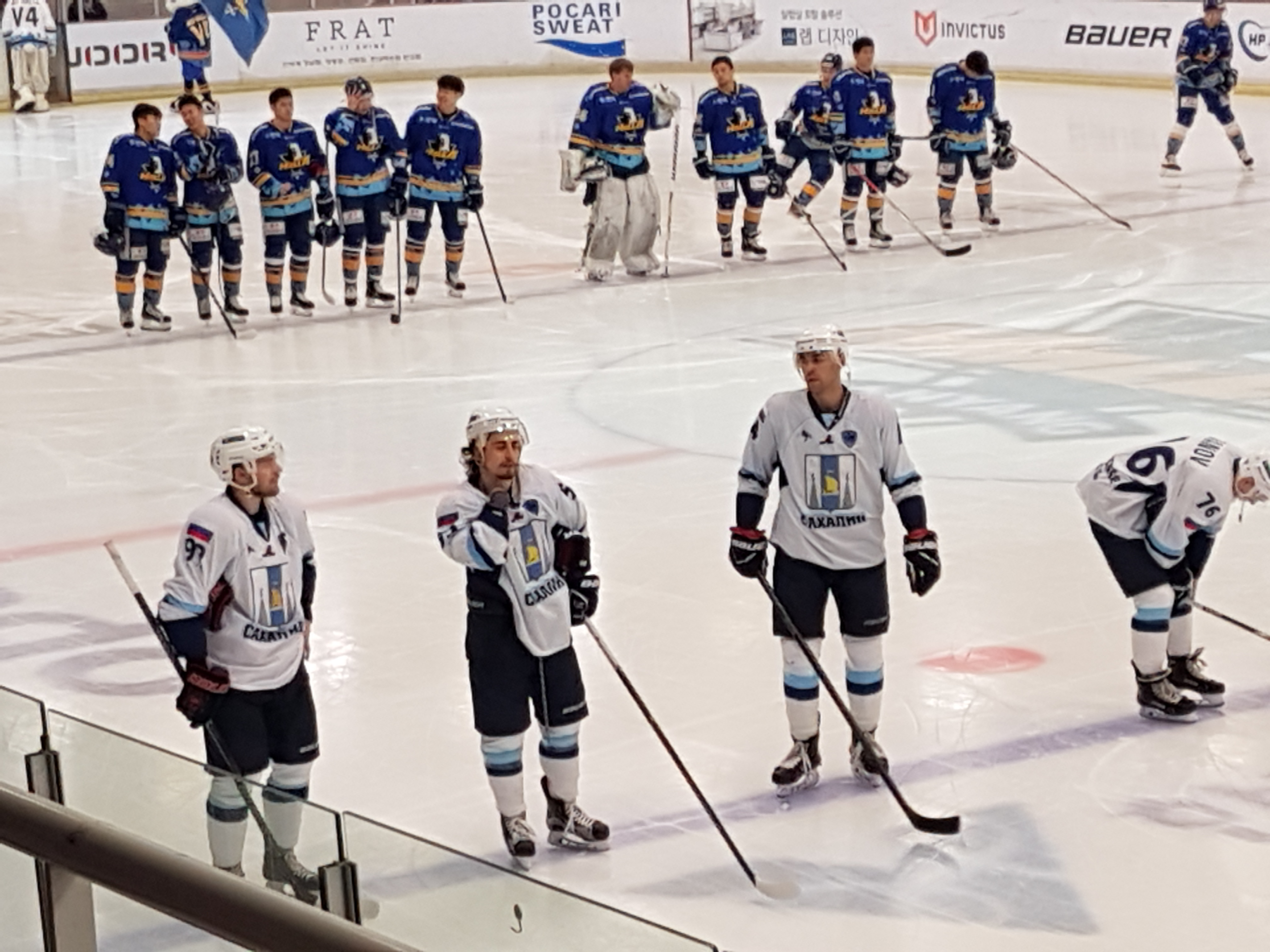
PSK Sakhalin prior to game one of the 2017 Asia League Ice Hockey Final.

== Honours ==
- Asia League Ice Hockey:

Regular season winners (2): 2017–18, 2019–20
Championship winners (2): 2018–19, 2019–20 (Note: Shared with Anyang Halla.)
