= Yulian Manev =

Bulgarian footballer

Personal information
- Full name: Yulian Georgiev Manev
- Date of birth: 13 March 1966 (age 60)
- Place of birth: Teteven, Bulgaria
- Height: 1.60 m (5 ft 3 in)

Yulian Georgiev Manev (Bulgarian: Юлиян Георгиев Манев) (born 13 March 1966) is a Bulgarian former footballer who played as a forward. Manev was a prominent member of the Olympik Teteven team during their only season in the A PFG.
