= Yulian Popovich =

Kazakhstani ice hockey player

- Born: June 15, 1990 (age 34); Rudny, Kazakh SSR, Soviet Union
- Height: 5 ft 9 in (175 cm)
- Weight: 170 lb (77 kg; 12 st 2 lb)
- Position: Forward
- Shoots: Left
- KHL team Former teams: Barys Astana; Gornyak Rudny
- NHL draft: Undrafted
- Playing career: 2007–present

Yulian Vasilievich Popovich (Russian: Юлиан Васильевич Попович; born June 15, 1990) is a Kazakhstani professional ice hockey forward who plays with Barys Astana in the Kontinental Hockey League (KHL).
