= Leroy Zwicker =

Canadian painter (1906–1987)

- Born: LeRoy Judson Zwicker; July 21, 1906; Halifax, Nova Scotia, Canada
- Died: August 1, 1987 (aged 81); Halifax, Nova Scotia, Canada
- Education: Victoria School of Art and Design, Halifax, (which became the Nova Scotia College of Art in 1925), Art Students League in New York with Ashcan School realist George Luks; studied with Jack Levine at the Skowhegan School of Painting, Madison, Maine, USA, c. 1946; studied with Alfred Pellan, c. 1946
- Occupations: Painter; printmaker; writer
- Spouse: Marguerite Porter (m. 1937)
- Awards: In 1969, he was awarded an Honorary Doctorate in Fine Arts from NSCAD University.

Leroy Zwicker (July 21, 1906 – August 1, 1987) was a Canadian painter, printmaker and writer from Nova Scotia. In 1937, Leroy and his wife Marguerite took over the management of Zwicker's Gallery which his father had founded, and went on to run it successfully. It is still in existence today though with different ownership. At the time Leroy and Marguerite Porter Zwicker took over the gallery, Zwicker's Gallery was the largest art gallery in Atlantic Canada.

== Biography ==
Leroy Zwicker was born on July 21, 1906 in Halifax, Nova Scotia. He attended the Victoria School of Art and Design, Halifax, (which became the Nova Scotia College of Art in 1925), studying with Elizabeth Styring Nutt, Stanley Royle and Henry M. Rosenberg. He then continued his studies at the Art Students League in New York with Ashcan School realist George Luks, and worked in the etching department of a gallery.

He painted well-composed studies of Nova Scotian fishing villages and other subjects and made etchings. In 1924, one of Zwicker's paintings was included in the British Empire Exhibition in England, and from 1930, he exhibited with the Royal Canadian Academy of Arts. Later study with Alfred Pellan around 1946 enthused him with the changes taking place in the art world and he became one of the few artists in Nova Scotia in the 1940s and 1950s to practise cubism and abstraction.

Leroy Zwicker was a steadfast presence on the Halifax and Canadian art community throughout the 1940s, 1950s, and 1960s. He helped to establish the Nova Scotia Society of Artists and the Marine Art Association, as well as in 1940, becoming the business manager of Maritime Art, Canada's first art magazine, published by the Maritime Art Association until 1943. (In 1944, the magazine moved to Ottawa with its editor Walter Abell (formerly of Acadia University) and became the national publication Canadian Art). But around 1961, he began to experience the onset of Parkinson's disease, and he ceased to paint around 1974 or 1975.

As the owner of Nova Scotia's first and largest commercial gallery from 1942 to 1968, he became a representative in provincial art associations and a member of the board of trustees, including Member of the Board of Governors at the Nova Scotia College of Art in Halifax. He also founded the Professional Art Dealer's Association of Canada, and during the mid-1980s served as Chairman of the Acquisition Committee at the Art Gallery of Nova Scotia.

In 1969, he was awarded an Honorary Doctorate in Fine Arts from the NSCAD University. In 1975, Zwicker was given a retrospective titled LeRoy Zwicker: In Retrospect, at the Art Gallery of Nova Scotia with eighty-seven paintings covering a fifty year span from 1925 to 1975.

Both Zwicker and his wife Marguerite Porter Zwicker were patrons of the Art Gallery of Nova Scotia after its establishment. During the 1980s, they gave a donation of $4 million in support of the project to conserve and exhibit the house of Canadian outsider artist Maud Lewis.

Leroy Zwicker's work as an artist has been collected in depth by the Art Gallery of Nova Scotia (127 works). His work also is represented in the National Gallery of Canada. His considerable importance to the Halifax art community is discussed by Ray Cronin in "Halifax Art & Artists".
