= Zwicker =

Zwicker may refer to:

== Medicine ==
- Zwicker tone, auditory illusion which resembles tinnitus.

== People with the surname ==
It is a German surname derived from Zwichau meaning "market town".

- Andrew Zwicker, New Jersey Assemblyman representing the 16th Legislative District
- Barrie Wallace Zwicker, Canadian alternative media journalist, documentary producer, and political activist
- Christina Zwicker, Croatian artistic gymnast
- Eberhard Zwicker, German acoustics scientist and full professor at the Technical University of Munich
- Edward Zwicker, Nova Scotian merchant and political figure
- Leroy Zwicker, Canadian painter, printmaker, and writer
- Marguerite Porter Zwicker, Canadian watercolor painter and art promoter
- Steven N. Zwicker, American literary scholar and Washington University Professor
- William S. Zwicker, an American mathematician and the William D. Williams Professor of Mathematics at Union College in Schenectady, New York

== Games ==
- Zwicker (card game), a north German card game for two to four players
