= Marguerite Porter Zwicker =

Canadian artist and art promoter

Mary Marguerite Porter Zwicker
- Born: Mary Marguerite Porter; 1904; Pleasant Valley, Nova Scotia
- Died: 1993 (aged 88–89); Halifax, Nova Scotia
- Education: Nova Scotia College of Art
- Occupations: Watercolorist, art promoter and gallery owner
- Spouse: Leroy Zwicker

Mary Marguerite Porter Zwicker (née Porter, 1904–1993) was a Canadian artist and art promoter from Halifax, Nova Scotia. Known for her watercolor paintings of landscapes and villages in Nova Scotia, Zwicker exhibited her work at the Royal Canadian Academy of Arts, the Art Association of Montreal and the Art Gallery of Nova Scotia. Together with her husband, Leroy Zwicker, she owned and operated Zwicker's Gallery; for most of the 20th century, Zwicker's Gallery was the only Halifax gallery that routinely held art exhibits open to the public. It still operates.

== Biography ==
Marguerite Porter was born in 1904 in Pleasant Valley, Nova Scotia. She studied painting at the Nova Scotia College of Art, and also traveled to the United States to study privately with German-American abstract expressionist painter Hans Hofmann. In 1928, as a senior student at the Nova Scotia College of Art, Porter had one of her etchings accepted by the Society of Canadian Painters, Etchers and Engravers. That same year, she began teaching classes at the College, earning an annual salary of $600 for the next two years. In 1937, she married a fellow art student named Leroy Zwicker.

Zwicker taught painting at Acadia University in Wolfville and eventually led "painting and cultural tours" in countries such as Spain, Italy and Portugal. She became known for her watercolor paintings of Nova Scotia landscapes and villages, and she exhibited her work at the Royal Canadian Academy of Arts and the Art Association of Montreal. Zwicker was a member of the Nova Scotia Society of Artists.

In 1957, Zwicker and her husband became owners of Zwicker's Gallery, the longest-running art store and commercial gallery in Halifax. Zwicker's Gallery had been established in 1886 by a member of Leroy's family, and up until the 1970s it was the only gallery in Halifax that routinely held art exhibits open to the public; the gallery was a valuable outlet for local artists. The Zwickers continued to operate the gallery themselves until 1968, after which it passed into new ownership.

In 1959, Zwicker published a book entitled On My Own, in which she reflected on her European travels.

Both Zwicker and her husband were patrons of the Art Gallery of Nova Scotia (AGNS) after its establishment. During the 1980s, as AGNS fought to obtain funding to conserve and exhibit the house of Canadian folk artist Maude Lewis, the Zwickers offered a private donation of $4 million in support of the project. In 1991, Zwicker held a solo exhibit of her work at the Art Gallery of Nova Scotia.

Zwicker died in 1993 in Halifax.

== Education ==
Throughout the 19th century respectable women often enrolled themselves in finishing school instruction. Here, women practiced 'polite', ladylike activities such as music, embroidery, and watercolour painting. The Victoria School of Art and Design (VSAD), located in Halifax, Nova Scotia, was an exemplary institution of proper female art education. Today the VSAD is known as the Nova Scotia College of Art.

Marguerite Zwicker graduated from the Nova Scotia College of Art in 1928. After graduating she was hired at the college and taught there for two years as a junior teacher. Zwicker taught with Principal Elizabeth Styring Nutt, a well-known art supporter of the time. Between the years 1931 and 1933, Zwicker taught at Acadia University in exchange for room and board. While teaching at Acadia, she took a one-month art workshop with Stanley Royle in 1932. Zwicker learned colour values and the importance of dramatic contrast from Royle. This workshop gave Zwicker new artistic inspiration as she was enlightened by Royle's views on art. Throughout Royle's month-long workshop, Zwicker began to develop her own style of painting.

When Zwicker finished teaching at Acadia University, she took a break from her painting education. It wasn't until 1961 that she resumed her studies at summer painting schools in both Cape Cod and Florida. Classes were instructed by Eliot O'Hara, a famous American watercolourist. Zwicker learned the importance of painting on site from O'Hara. Zwicker's travels were purposeful to further both her artistic studies as well as her cultural experiences.

== Career ==
Zwicker traveled to Europe on sketching trips with fellow Nova Scotian artists. During her own time, she also traveled extensively in Europe, the West Indies, the United States, and across Canada. Zwicker used her travels as an opportunity to study and practice her craft. In 1959 Zwicker ventured to Europe where she recorded her experiences in a journal. To accompany her writing, Zwicker drew ink illustrations in her text. Upon returning home, Zwicker printed one hundred copies of her book and distributed it among her friends. The final product of her book was titled On My Own. During the European trip that inspired her book, Zwicker fell in love with Italy. She later returned to the country with sixty students, leading them on a cultural tour of painting, studying, and sightseeing between the years of 1962 and 1965.

Zwicker typically painted three watercolours a week. Only a handful of Nova Scotian artists were able to support themselves on painting alone, and Zwicker became one of these such artists. Few Nova Scotian artists have been as popular as Zwicker became during her career. Zwicker believed in the idea of "art for the sake of art". Between 1933 and 1937, Zwicker used her studio shop in Yarmouth as a place to make and sell her art, but also as a space for art appreciation. One of Zwicker's most notable accomplishments was the work she completed for Canada's first art magazine, Maritime Art.

Between 1880 and 1950, several art schools were founded including: the Victoria School of Art and Design, the Nova Scotia Museum of Fine Arts, the Nova Scotia Society of Artists (NSSA) and the Maritime Art Association (MAA). The increasing number of art institutions created more opportunities for artists to show their works publicly. Zwicker was a member and regularly exhibited her paintings with the NSSA, the MAA, and the Halifax Department of Education. In the United States, Zwicker showed works with the California Watercolour Society. On a national scale, she exhibited works with the Royal Canadian Academy of Arts, as well as the Art Association of Montreal. Additionally, Zwicker conducted several solo exhibitions of her own works. As a personal rule, Zwicker did not keep track of the work she sold to customers. This lack of documentation has made it difficult for Zwicker's work to be researched on a scholarly level.

== Medium ==
Marguerite Zwicker's artwork is almost exclusively watercolour. Technique, composition, and design are all emphasized as important structural components of Zwicker's watercolours. Her compositions primarily display the houses of Nova Scotia or landscape scenes of her home province. Zwicker's watercolour images commonly contrast transpaecny with an intense purity of colour. It was Zwicker's opinion that "watercolour should never be reserved for quick preliminary sketches, nor necessarily should it be viewed as a more limited medium in range than oil." Her paintings are often viewed as an example of the medium at its most developed point of artistry.

Watercolour was typically noted as a "woman's medium" for its lighter, more expressive appearance. However, laying down pigment suspended in water required a confidence not all artists were able to successfully possess. Zwicker herself was quoted saying, "Anyone can paint in watercolour, but very few can paint watercolours well."

== Marriage ==
Marguerite Porter married Leroy Zwicker (1906–1987) in 1937. Marguerite continued to pursue cultural activities while married to Leroy. From early on in their marriage, Marguerite and Leroy agreed that creating art was the most important value within their relationship. It was a hobby and career they both enjoyed, which led them to organize their lives around their production of art. Leroy was also a successful painter, and his artwork was featured in many of the same exhibitions as Marguerite's. The pair would travel on weekend sketching trips together. Zwicker and her husband ran Granville Gallery in Halifax between 1942 and 1969. Later in life, Marguerite and Leroy owned the only art venue in Halifax that regularly featured public art exhibitions. It became known as "Zwicker's Gallery" and was a major accomplishment for them both. From 1974 onward, Leroy became increasingly ill and he died in 1987. Marguerite continued painting up until her own death in 1993.

== Exhibitions ==
Although the majority of Zwicker's paintings were exhibited within Nova Scotia, she also showed her works in travelling exhibitions across Canada, the United States, and Europe. Landscape motifs were known to dominate Nova Scotian art exhibitions in the 1920s and 1930s.

=== Ten Nova Scotian Women ===
In the Fall of 1983, the Killiam Lecture Committee at Dalhousie University approached a Nova Scotian art gallery with the idea for an exhibition. The exhibition would show artwork painted by ten Nova Scotian women artists, highlighting their careers. Each artist featured in this show, including Marguerite Zwicker, had made significant contributions to the heritage of art creation within the province of Nova Scotia. As this exhibition primarily showcased little known or uncatalogued female artists, the greatest challenge was locating and collecting their art works. The goal of Ten Nova Scotian Women was to bring local female artists into the spotlight and encourage the rediscovery of their paintings. The exhibition focused on art created by the ten women between 1880 and 1955.

Works by Marguerite Zwicker exhibited in Ten Nova Scotian Women include:

- Portrait, watercolour, 30.5 x 38.0, Art Gallery of Nova Scotia
- Untitled (Old Sackville Church), watercolour, 24.1 x 23.1, Fine Art Collection, Public Archives of Nova Scotia
- Tranquility, watercolour, 44.6 x 58.5, Art Gallery of Nova Scotia
- Gorsebrook, 1949, watercolour, 38.1 x 55.9, Fine Art Collection, Public Archives of Nova Scotia

=== Nova Scotian Pictures ===
This exhibition was put on in 1946 by the Halifax Department of Education. This annual exhibition traveled province-wide to approximately one hundred towns and villages. When the exhibition closed it had been seen by 35,000 Nova Scotians. Marguerite Zwicker was asked to feature some of her new paintings in this exhibition.

=== Tony Saulnier Exhibition ===
Tony Saulnier was a dedicated patron of the arts and devoted a great deal of his time and energy to building his own collection of art. He was especially interested in the art of female Atlantic Canadian artists. Saulnier created an exhibition that gave the public a chance to see a selection of works hand-picked from his own collection. He specifically called upon Zwicker, asking her for new works that he could include in his exhibit. Throughout the coming year Saulnier would continue to request artwork from Zwicker. His favourites were her large floral watercolours, several of which lined the hallways in his home for many years.

Three of Zwicker's works featured in Saulnier's Exhibition were:

- At the Arm, 1936, oil on board, 39.5 x 50.0
- Delphiniums, c. 1985, watercolour on paper, 70.3 x 52.8
- Calla Lilies, 1940, watercolour on paper, 30.5 x 40.5

=== Spring Exhibition ===
The Spring Exhibition was put on annually by the Art Association of Montreal. Landscapes were a favoured subject matter in this exhibition. Zwicker showed her watercolours in this exhibition almost every year. In some years, both Marguerite and Leroy exhibited their works.

=== Art Gallery of Nova Scotia ===
In 1991, the Art Gallery of Nova Scotia developed an exhibition solely around the works of Marguerite Zwicker. The show was meant to pay tribute to Zwicker, acknowledging her long career. Bernard Riordon was the AGNS director and a personal friend of Zwicker's. When Zwicker died in 1993, Riordon commented, "Marguerite Zwicker was a role model ... the enthusiasm, energy, and public spiritedness she exhibited in all her endeavors will be missed."
