= Cathy Busby =

Canadian artist

- Born: 1958 (age 67–68); Toronto, Ontario, Canada
- Education: Concordia University, NSCAD, New York University
- Known for: Multimedia artist, Teacher, Writer, artist who uses Printed Matter
- Website: www.cathybusby.ca

Cathy Busby is a Canadian artist based in Vancouver, British Columbia. Born in Toronto, Ontario, on April 20, 1958, Busby is an artist who often amasses collections to create art and make meaning, including public apologies; vehicle make and model names; neighbourhood posters; message t-shirts; corporate slogans; self-help books; and portraits.

During her undergraduate studies at the Nova Scotia College of Art and Design (NSCAD) (BFA 1984), she made art and voiced her concerns about women's rights, including affordable housing, job equity, and the proliferation of militarism. During her MA in Media Studies (Concordia University, 1992) and her PhD in communication (at Concordia University, 1999) she investigated self-help books and recovery culture as a way to think about the politics of pain, later making art about public apologies, memorials, and care within and outside healthcare institutions.

Over the last 30 years, she has exhibited nationally and internationally including in New York, Beijing, Melbourne and Berlin.

== Background ==
=== Education ===
Busby completed a Bachelor of Fine Arts from NSCAD University (1984) and a Masters of Arts in Media Studies from Concordia University (1992). She has a PhD in Communication from Concordia University (1999) and was a Fulbright Scholar at New York University (1995–1996).

=== Teaching and writing ===
Busby was an adjunct professor of visual art in the UBC Department of Art History, Visual Art and Theory (2013–2019), and has lectured and instructed at various institutions including Emily Carr University, Mount Saint Vincent University, NSCAD and Carleton University.

Busby is the author of numerous artist books and publications including I WONDER: Art + Care + Dementia (Art Metropole, 2025). She is the interviewer/editor of Making the Invisible Visible (University of the Creative Arts, 2016), and the co-editor of, and a contributor to, the anthology When Pain Strikes (University of Minnesota, 1999).

Her critical writing and artworks have been published in Image, Index and Inscription: Essays on Contemporary Canadian Photography (Gallery 44, YYZ Press, 2005) and General Idea Editions 1967–1995 (Blackwood Gallery, 2003), as well as C Magazine, Fuse, Tessara, Border/lines, Archivaria, The Capilano Review, and Canadian Art.

== Artwork ==
Over the last 30 years, Busby has exhibited extensively across Canada and internationally in New York, Beijing, Melbourne and Berlin. Recently her artistic and curatorial work has been shown at Griffin Art Projects, Art Metropole, Union Theological Seminary, the Morris and Helen Belkin Art Gallery, Simon Fraser University, and the Vancouver Art Gallery.

=== Collections ===
Busby has works in the public collections of several institutions and galleries, including the National Gallery of Canada, the Winnipeg Art Gallery, Carleton University Art Gallery, Nova Scotia Art Bank, Canada Council Art Bank, City of Ottawa Art Collection, the Nova Scotia College of Art and Design, Simon Fraser University Library Special Collections and Rare Books, and the Museum of Modern Art / Franklin Furnace Artist Book Collection.

=== Selected works ===
==== I WONDER: Art + Care + Dementia ====
Busby's publication I WONDER: Art + Care + Dementia (Art Metropole, 2025) began with a wall-text painting that echoed the words "I wonder" frequently spoken by Garry Neill Kennedy, Cathy Busby's late spouse. This book circles around the idea of wonder in narrating each of their life stories, their life together, and how they went through Kennedy's dementia decline—inside and outside the healthcare system, supported by friends, family, and their continued art making. Throughout 2025, Busby toured this book across Canada starting with its inaugural launch at the Vancouver Art Book Fair, and subsequent launches at C.L.A.M. (Vancouver), the Halifax Art Book Fair, Art Metropole (Toronto), and The Federal Store (Vancouver).

==== PARKING/PARKED ====
PARKING and PARKED are part of Busby's ongoing series of projects which centre collections of vehicle brand names activated through song and choral voice. The first version of this idea was PARKING GOTTINGEN ST. (2011), a collection of the names of all the vehicles parked on Göttingen St., Halifax, on July 8, 2011, which was later presented at Eyelevel Gallery as a floor-to-ceiling list and folder. In 2019, while teaching in the Visual Arts at UBC, Busby gathered all the names of cars in the nearby carpark to make PARKING, a five-part harmony madrigal composed by Earle Peach and performed at the AHVA Gallery at UBC. Then in 2024, Busby organized the gathering of vehicle brand names into a Call-and-Response event that took place on Saturday April 20, 2024. For this performative event, Busby led a group of around a dozen participants on a walk up and down Cordova St. in Vancouver, stopping to sing each vehicle name along the way. The collecting and sining of these names acted as a snapshot of the parked cars present on that day. On her website, Busby explains why this hybrid work around vehicle names is important to her by noting: "I'm interested in creating a lament about our dependence on car culture that's followed like a blind religion, despite its plethora of negative impacts."

==== WE CALL ====
Busby's WE CALL is a multi-iteration, site-specific wall-text work focusing on the Truth and Reconciliation Commission of Canada's (TRC) 94 Calls to Action, released in June 2015, to draw attention to the ways in which the government skirts responsibilities towards Indigenous rights and title.

The first iteration of WE CALL was produced as an installation at the Teck Gallery, (Simon Fraser University, 2017–2018), and shortly after the work was reimagined during a community based project with the Gitksan Wet'suwet'en Education Society (GWES) in Hazelton, British Columbia (2017). For the permanent installation at GWES, the Calls painted on the walls of the school were chosen and edited for the space in dialogue with, and in response to, the lived experiences of the Gitxsan and Wet'suwet'en communities in the area. In 2018, a third site-specific iteration of WE CALL was completed at Upper Canada College (UCC) in Toronto, where Busby worked collaboratively with the students and teachers to develop a set of community endorsed response to the TRC's Calls. In 2022, Busby facilitated a two-day trip bringing the UCC students to GWES to see the WE CALL installation there and meet the Gitxsan students involved in it.

===== WE ARE SORRY =====
One of Cathy Busby's best-known works, WE ARE SORRY (Melbourne 2009 / Winnipeg 2010 / Vancouver 2013–2016) commemorated public apologies by Canadian and Australian heads of state to the Indian Residential School survivors in Canada and the Stolen Generations in Australia. While these landmark apologies were relatively fleeting in their initial media moments, WE ARE SORRY prolonged their public presence. In Melbourne, WE ARE SORRY took place outdoors as part of the Laneway Commissions and the following year it was presented in Eckhardt Hall at the Winnipeg Art Gallery in conjunction with the launch of the Truth and Reconciliation Commission (2010). Since then adapted iterations of WE ARE SORRY have been presented at the Morris and Helen Belkin Art Gallery (2013), and as part of artist and hereditary Chief from the 'Na̱mg̱is First Nation, Beau Dick's work Awalaskenis II (2014) which was later commemorated in the exhibition Lalakenis/All Directions: A Journey of Truth and Unity (Belkin, 2016).

In January and February 2026, an exhibition of UH HUH / SORRY at the Wil Aballe Art Project, Vancouver, included works from Busby's collections SORRY, WE ARE SORRY and ATRIUM, alongside pieces by her former husband, Garry Kennedy (d. 2021). Busby and Kennedy had worked in parallel for many years, but rarely exhibited together.
