= The Goose Girl (disambiguation) =

"The Goose Girl" is a German fairy tale collected by the Brothers Grimm.

The Goose Girl may also refer to:

== Paintings ==
- The Goose Girl (Bouguereau), a painting by William-Adolphe Bouguereau
- The Goose Girl (Royle), a c. 1920s painting by English artist Stanley Royle (formerly attributed to Irish artist William John Leech)

== Books ==
- The Goose Girl (novel), by Shannon Hale
- The Goose Girl, a 1909 novel by Harold MacGrath

== Films ==
  - The Goose Girl (1915 film), a film adaptation starring Marguerite Clark
- The Goose Girl (1957 film), a West German family film, based on the fairy tale

== See also ==
- Gänseliesel (English: Goose Girl), a fountain in Göttingen, Germany
