= Education in Halifax, Nova Scotia =

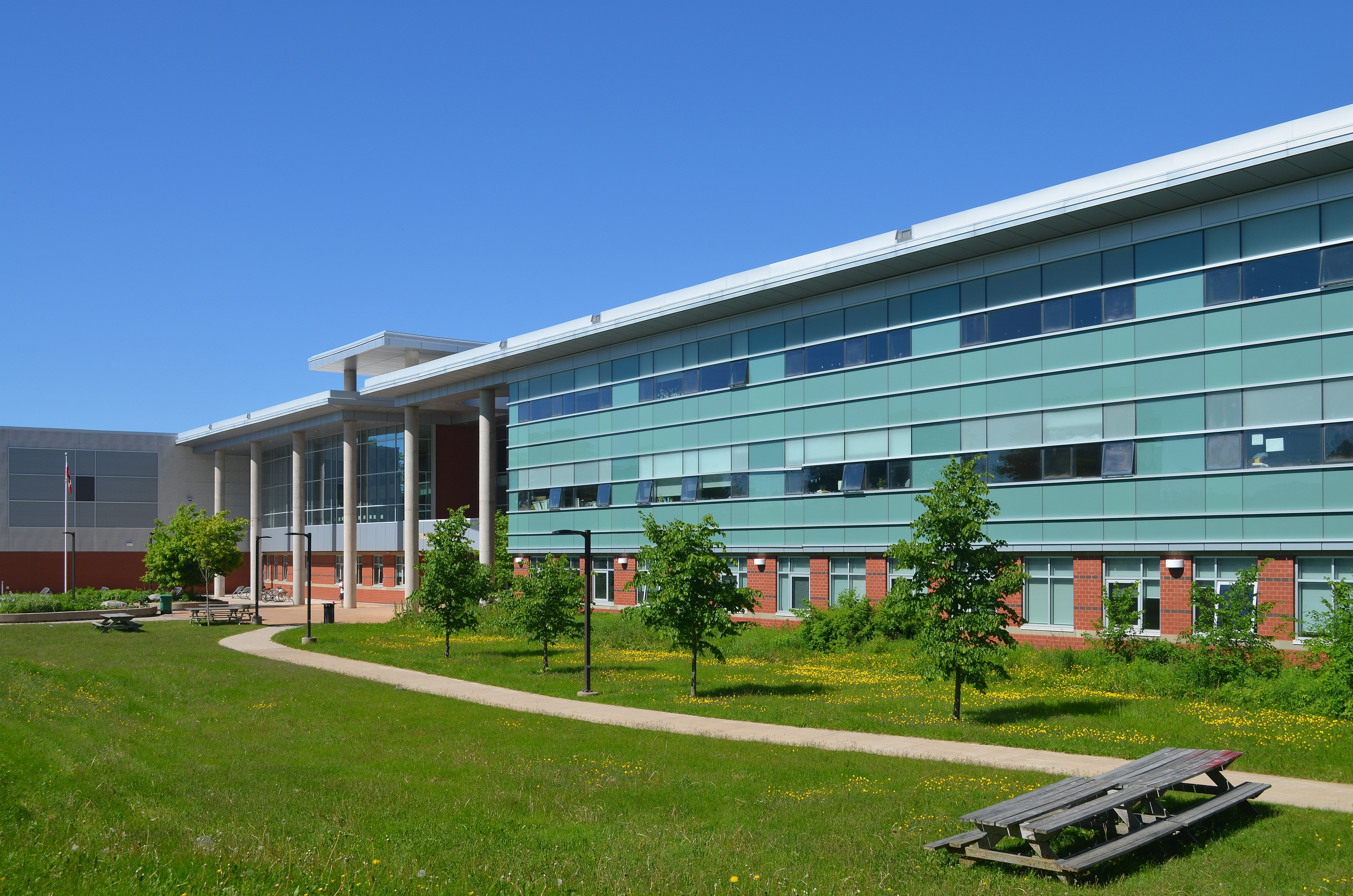
Citadel High School, a public secondary school in Halifax

Halifax, Nova Scotia has the largest selection of education options in Atlantic Canada.

== Public schools ==
The Halifax Regional Centre for Education (HRCE) is responsible for administering 135 public schools, divided into elementary, junior high and high school levels, providing instruction from primary to grade 12. With over 57,000 students, the HRCE is the largest school board in Atlantic Canada. The Conseil scolaire acadien provincial operates six public French language schools in the Halifax region.

== Private schools ==
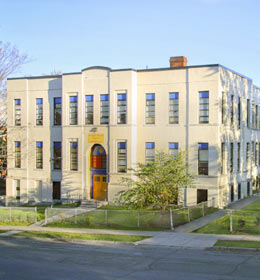
Shambhala School, a private school in the North End

There are 14 independent schools in the city, including:

- Armbrae Academy
- Bedford Academy
- Birch Hills Academy
- Churchill Academy
- East Coast Varsity
- Halifax Christian Academy
- Halifax Independent School
- Halifax Grammar School
- Maritime Conservatory of Performing Arts
- Maritime Muslim Academy
- Sacred Heart School of Halifax
- Sandy Lake Academy
- Shambhala School

== Universities ==
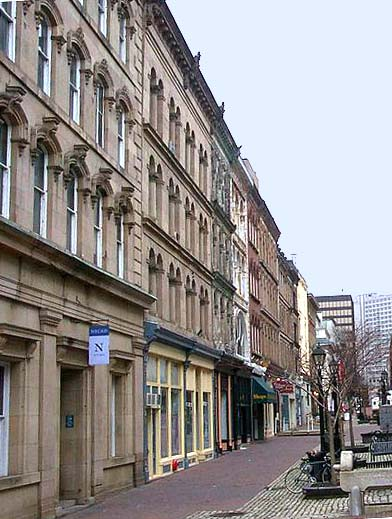
NSCAD University on the Granville Mall

The city is home to seven degree-granting post-secondary educational institutions. The following universities are located on the Halifax Peninsula:

- Dalhousie University
- Saint Mary's University
- University of King's College
- Atlantic School of Theology
- Nova Scotia College of Art and Design University
- Université Sainte-Anne, Halifax Campus

This university is located in suburban Rockingham:

- Mount Saint Vincent University

The former Technical University of Nova Scotia (TUNS) was merged into Dalhousie University. The University of King's College remains an independent institution but its students have access to Dalhousie's arts and science faculties.

Cape Breton University has a satellite campus in Halifax for extension courses.

== Community colleges ==
The Nova Scotia Community College network maintains three campuses in Halifax.

- Akerley Campus
- Institute of Technology Campus
- Ivany Campus (formerly called Waterfront Campus)

== Private colleges ==
There are also a variety of private career and business colleges located in and around Halifax's urban core.

== See also ==
- Sgoil Ghàidhlig an Àrd-Bhaile
