= Ruth Wainwright =

Ruth Wainright can refer to:

- Ruth Symes, British children's author
- Ruth Salter Wainwright (1902-1984), Canadian artist
