= Monica Tap =

Canadian painter, artist and academic (born 1962)

- Born: Monica Tap; 1962 (age 63–64); Edmonton, Alberta, Canada
- Education: Nova Scotia College of Art and Design
- Known for: Painter
- Website: monicatap.com

Monica Tap (born 1962) is a Canadian painter, artist and educator. She lives in Toronto, Ontario, and teaches at the University of Guelph. She is known for engaging and challenging conventions concerning landscape and still-life painting.

== Biography ==
Tap was born in Edmonton, Alberta. She attended the Alberta College of Art, University of Alberta (1986), and NSCAD University for her BFA (1990), and MFA (1996). She studied Fine Arts with Gerald Ferguson. Tap is also a professor at the University of Guelph in the School of Fine Art and Music.

== Artistic career ==
Tap often uses photographs and video stills as source material for her paintings. For instance, in her work for the exhibition Running on Empty, she peered out of window of a car, and used a digital camera to record the landscape ("at the Mpeg standard format of 15 frames per second" as Heather Nicol, the author of the catalogue, said). The resulting images are blurred and though not abstract, are toward abstraction. Barry Schwabsky has noted that "her art offers one of the richest and most original revisionary instances of how the temporality of the act of looking can continue to keep painting in motion today".

She has exhibited her work across Canada and abroad, and is currently represented by MKG127 in Toronto and Peter Robertson Gallery in Edmonton.

== Selected awards and honours ==
- 2008 Banff Centre for the Arts, "Artist in a Mountain Landscape"
- 2005–2009 Social Sciences and Humanities Research Council, Research/ Creation Grant in Fine Art "Translation as a Strategy of Renewal in Painting"
- 2005 Warren Goldring Scholarship, Banff, Optic Nerve Residency
- 2005 Open Studio Print Residency, Toronto, Ontario
- 2002 Banff Centre for the Arts, "New Works"

== Collections ==
Monica Tap's works are included in many public and private collections including the Art Gallery of Alberta, the Art Gallery of Guelph, the Art Gallery of Nova Scotia, the Tom Thomson Art Gallery, Foreign Affairs and International Trade Canada (NYC, Berlin), Canada House (London, UK), Bank of Montréal, TELUS, Royal Bank of Canada, Scotiabank, Four Seasons Hotel & Resorts, ESSO Imperial Oil Canada, CIBC Mellon, University of Toronto, Würth Collection (Germany), and the Crystal Bridges Museum of American Art.

== Publications ==
- 2004 The Princess and the Paint box. In Jane Fine, (invited essay for exhibition catalogue). Peirogi, Brooklyn, New York, p. 24
- 2002 Hungry Eyes in Hungry Eyes: New Abstract Painting in New York and Toronto (curated by Monica Tapp). Dalhousie Art Gallery.
