= Ruth Salter Wainwright =

Canadian painter

- Born: 1902; Nova Scotia, Canada
- Died: 1984 (aged 81–82); Nova Scotia, Canada
- Known for: Painter, Musician
- Movement: Maritime Modernist

Ruth Salter Wainwright (1902–1984), was a Canadian painter known for her pioneering of the Maritime Modernist movement.

== Biography ==
Ruth Salter Wainwright was born in 1902 in Nova Scotia. From 1917 to 1921, she studied at the Halifax Ladies' College where she received her teaching certificate. Lewis and Edith Smith were among her teachers. She also studied with the British artists Elizabeth Styring Nutt and Stanley Royle who had emigrated to the Maritimes.

As well as her interest in the visual arts, Wainwright pursued her interest in music, graduating from the Halifax Conservatory of Music in 1924.

In the 1930s, she exhibited her work with the Canadian Society of Painters in Water Colour and the Nova Scotia Society of Artists (NSSA). In the 1940s, Wainwright served as the treasurer and on the executive council of the NSSA. During the same period she played harp with a CBC Radio orchestra located in Halifax. In the 1950s, she offered painting classes and mentor to several younger female artists in Halifax including Aileen Maegher and Carol Hoorn Fraser.

Wainwright furthered her art career by attending the Hans Hofmann School of Fine Art, Summer Sessions in Provincetown, Massachusetts. She attended in the summer of 1953 and 1955. From this experience Wainwright moved away from realism and towards a style related to Abstract Expressionism.

She continued exhibiting into her eighties and her work has been included in the collection of the Art Gallery of Nova Scotia and the National Gallery of Canada.

Wainwright died in 1984 in Nova Scotia.
