= Hesson =

Hesson is a surname. Notable people with the surname include:

- Audrey Dear Hesson (born 1929), Canadian practical craft artist
- Mike Hesson (born 1974), New Zealand cricket coach
- Myles Hesson (born 1990), British basketball player
- Samuel Rollin Hesson (1829–1915), Irish-born merchant and politician
- Shelley Hesson (born 1976), New Zealand sailor
