= Karin Jones (artist) =

Canadian artist

- Education: NSCAD University (MFA, Craft), Vancouver Community College (Diploma, Jewelry Art & Design)
- Occupation: Artist
- Known for: Contemporary art, jewelry, craft
- Website: https://karinjones.ca/

Karin Jones is an interdisciplinary artist based in Vancouver and Montreal, Canada, with a background in jewelry and craft. Jones' contemporary art practice examines ways that historical narratives can shape identity and uses site-specific installation to explore the materiality of objects as representations of social and political histories. Her work is held in the permanent collections of the Vancouver Art Gallery in Vancouver, British Columbia, the Royal Ontario Museum in Toronto, Ontario, the Agnes Etherington Art Centre at Queen’s University in Kingston, Ontario, and the Metal Museum (formerly the National Ornamental Metal Museum) in Memphis, Tennessee.

== Education ==
Jones received a Diploma in Jewellery Art and Design from Vancouver Community College in 1993. She then worked as a goldsmith and independent artisan and undertook apprenticeship opportunities in the United States and Europe. In 2018, Jones received an MFA, with a specialization in Craft, from NSCAD University in Halifax, Nova Scotia.

Jones teaches at Vancouver Community College and has previously served as Department Head of the Jewellery Art and Design Program.

== Artistic practice ==
Jones' work engages with material culture to explore themes of Black femininity, racial and cultural identity, notions of Whiteness and the influence of Western beauty standards on racialized women, and historical narratives related to enslavement, segregation, and African diaspora in the Americas. Materials used in Jones' artistic practice include human hair, synthetic hair extensions, textiles, raw cotton, cord, dried corn, leather, steel, and brass.

In the installation Worn, Jones presents the viewer with a black Victorian-era mourning dress constructed of a fabric that is made up of approximately 400 braided synthetic hair extensions that have been hand-stitched together. The dress is mounted on a dress form and the surrounding floor is covered with natural cotton bolls, some of which are stuffed with the artist's own hair. Connections are made between historical and contemporary visual and material culture to evoke complexities of race, femininity, and African identity shaped by colonial displacement, slavery, and oppression.

In the (body of work) series, Jones displays several neckpieces on wall-mounted wood panels. Each piece utilizes restraints and materials used during the period of enslavement of African peoples in the Americas, which are then assembled together as jewelry and objects of bodily adornment. Collectively, these objects explore aspects of African diasporic identity and juxtaposing themes of pride and shame, horror and fascination, loss and belonging.

Another series, IV Jewellery, utilizes contemporary materials such as clear intravenous (IV) tubing from medical devices, which is embedded with seed pearls and constructed into necklaces that are embellished with 3D printed elements and bronze-cast plastic objects to present retro- and Afro-futuristic aesthetics.

In The Golden Section, commercially available human hair extensions are applied to vinyl mesh screens using wig-making techniques. The segments of bleached-blond hair are curled, braided, and cut into minimalist geometric patterns. In this series, hair is explored as a symbol of European beauty ideals while also examining relationships between capitalism, commodification, race, and identity through the global trade of human hair.

== Select exhibitions ==
=== Solo exhibitions ===
- 2024: The Golden Section, at Art Mûr in Montreal, QC.
- 2023: Karin Jones: Ornament and Instrument, at the Burnaby Art Gallery, Burnaby, BC. Curated by Jennifer Cane.
- 2022: The Golden Section, at Burrard Arts Foundation in Vancouver, BC.
- 2019: Precious, at The Reach Gallery Museum in Abbotsford, BC. Curated by Adrienne Fast.

=== Duo exhibitions ===
- 2020: Labour’s Trace, with Amy Malbeuf, at the Richmond Art Gallery, Richmond, BC. Curated by Nan Capogna.

=== Group exhibitions ===
- 2025: Town + Country: Narratives of Property and Capital at the Morris and Helen Belkin Art Gallery in Vancouver, British Columbia. Curated by Caitlin Jones, Charo Neville and Melanie O’Brian.
- 2024: The Chorus is Speaking at the Legacy Art Galleries, University of Victoria in Victoria, British Columbia. Curated by Jenelle Pasiechnik.
- 2024: Canadian Modern at the Royal British Columbia Museum in Victoria, British Columbia. Curated by Rachel Gottlieb.
- 2024: un/tangling, un/covering, un/doing at the Surrey Art Gallery in Surrey, British Columbia. Curated by Suvi Bains.
- 2023: The Art of Conversation at the Gordon Smith Gallery in North Vancouver, British Columbia. Curated by Janet Wang and Amelia Epp.
- 2023: Second Skin at the Art Gallery of Alberta in Edmonton, Alberta. Curated by Lindsey Sharman.
- 2022: History Is Rarely Black or White at the Agnes Etherington Art Centre, Queen's University in Kingston, Ontario. Curated by Jason Cyrus.
- 2022: Canadian Modern at the Royal Ontario Museum in Toronto, Ontario. Curated by Rachel Gotlieb.
- 2022: Animal, Vegetable, Mineral at the Harbourfront Centre in Toronto, Ontario. Curated by Melanie Egan.
- 2010: By Hand/BC and Yukon, The Art of Craft, at the Museum of Vancouver, Vancouver, BC. Curated by Sandra Alfoldy and presented with the Vancouver 2010 Cultural Olympiad.

=== Installations ===
- 2016: Worn at the McIntosh Gallery in London, Ontario. Curated by Catherine Elliott Shaw.
- 2015: Worn: Shaping Black Feminine Identity at the Royal Ontario Museum in Toronto, Ontario.

== Awards and recognition ==
In 2022, Jones was longlisted for the Sobey Art Award, Canada's largest prize for young Canadian artists, representing the West Coast & Yukon region.

== Publications ==
=== Exhibition catalogues ===
- Karin Jones: Ornament & Instrument, with contributions from Jennifer Cane and Cecily Nicholson. (Burnaby: Burnaby Art Gallery, 2023. ISBN 9781927364468).
- Canadian Modern: Design from the Royal Ontario Museum, edited by Rachel Gotlieb. (Toronto: Royal Ontario Museum Press, 2022. ISBN 9780888545329).
- Crafting a Legacy: 40 Years of Collecting & Exhibiting at the Metal Museum, edited by Nan Cook and Brooke Garcia, with an introduction by Grace Stewart. (Memphis: Metal Museum, 2019. ISBN 9780578419763).

=== Books ===
- Western Voices in Canadian Art by Patricia E. Bovey, pp. 363-365. (Winnipeg: University of Manitoba Press, 2023. ISBN 9780887550478).

=== Writing ===
- "Longing and Belonging: A Personal Journey through Art and Identity," in Making History: Visual Arts & Blackness in Canada, edited by Julie Crooks, Dominique Fontaine, and Silvia Forni, pp. 162-167. (Toronto: Royal Ontario Museum, 2023. ISBN 9780774890649).
