= Violet Gillett =

Canadian painter and educator (1898–1996)

Violet Amy Gillett
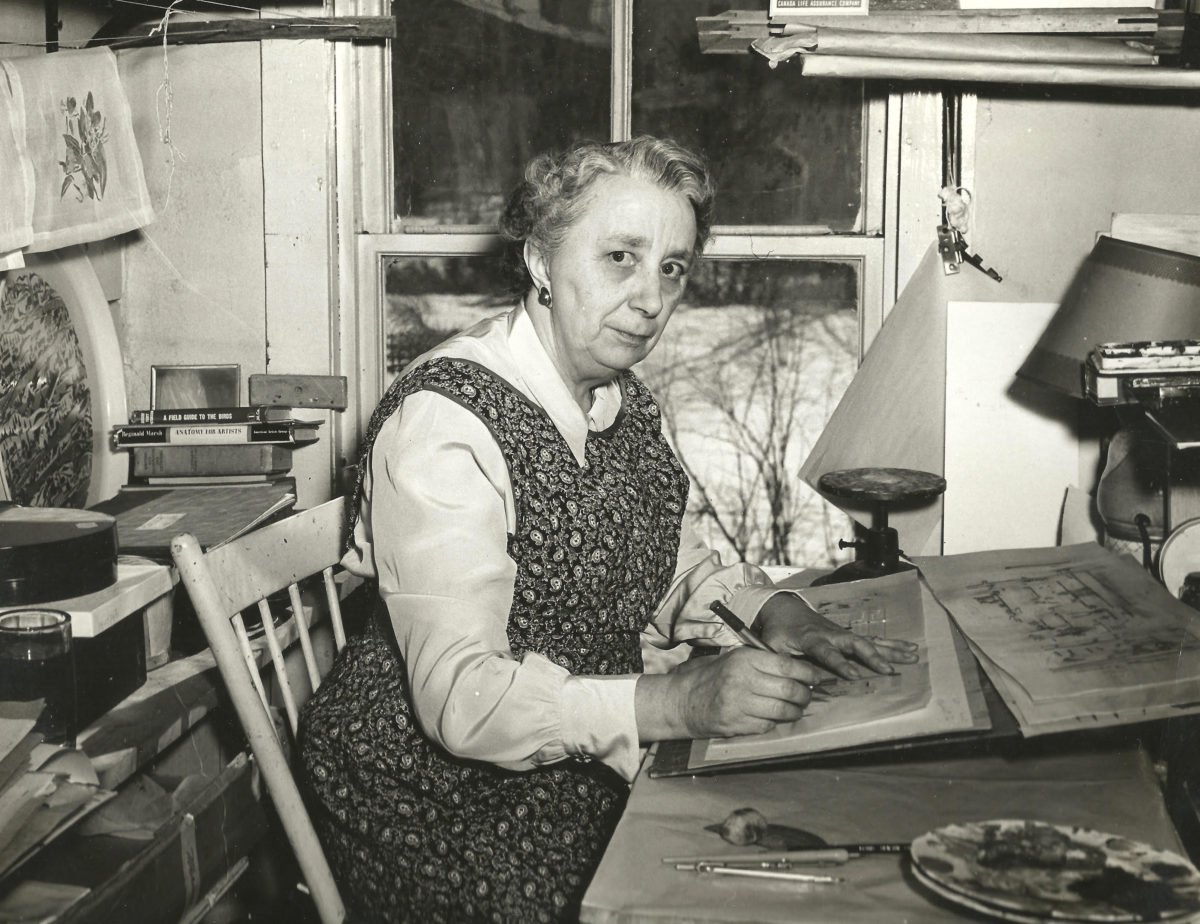
- Born: 14 July 1898; Liverpool, United Kingdom
- Died: January 20, 1996 (aged 97); Perth-Andover, Canada
- Known for: Painter, Educator
- Awards: Order of Canada (1976)

Violet Amy Gillett CM (1898–1996) was a Canadian artist and educator known for her encouragement of the arts in New Brunswick.

== Early life and education ==
Gillett was born in Liverpool, England in 1898. Her parents, Walter Gillett and Ada Syson, had been married in 1893 and her sister Beatrice was born two years before Violet. Her early childhood was spent in Gloucester, England, where her father worked at the John Bellows printing company.

Her family emigrated to Canada in 1908. After farming in rural Victoria County, New Brunswick for two years, they moved to the village of Andover, where Walter Gillett opened a general store in 1911.

Gillett attended normal school in Fredericton and taught at a rural one-room school in Victoria County before entering the Ontario College of Art in Toronto in 1919. A scholarship awarded after her first year was insufficient to cover her living expenses. On the recommendation of Arthur Lismer she was hired by the University of Toronto Faculty of Medicine to make coloured drawings of pathological specimens in the university's collection. For four years she was employed full time as artist and cataloguer of specimens, while taking evening art classes at the College. She also provided illustrations for publications by the medical school's faculty, including Frederick Banting and Charles Best's research on insulin.

== Career ==
=== Saint John ===
In 1926, Gillett was hired as the first Head of the Fine and Applied Arts department at the newly constructed Saint John Vocational School in Saint John, New Brunswick. In 1928 she received funding from the Board of Vocational Education to attend the Royal College of Art in London in order to improve her knowledge of commercial art. She returned to Saint John Vocational School in 1930, having received her associate degree after two years instead of the usual three. She remained there until her retirement in 1948.

During her tenure at Saint John Vocational School Gillett was active in the creation of Maritime Art magazine. This publication was the first Canadian magazine with a sole focus on the visual arts. The first issue was published in 1940 under the auspices of the Maritime Art Association. Gillett and student volunteers from the Vocational School were responsible for production of the first issues.

Gillett participated in the formation of the Maritime Art Association. She was the secretary for nine years and succeeded Walter Abell as president in 1946. As president Gillett emphasized art as a community good, insisting on the importance of active "creation and education" over passive "appreciation".

Gillett promoted the teaching of creative art to children. In 1937, she delivered a lecture to the Maritime Art Association entitled "A Plea for the Furtherance of Art Education in the Public Schools", arguing for its importance in promoting young people's development. In the same year she also wrote a commentary to accompany Creative Art by Children, a travelling exhibition from the National Gallery of Canada featuring children's works from Arthur Lismer's classes at the Art Gallery of Toronto. She was invited to write a curriculum for art education in New Brunswick public schools. Written in collaboration with her fellow artist Miller Brittain and drawing on the ideas of the Austrian art educator Franz Cižek, this curriculum was adopted by the New Brunswick Department of Education in 1939.

=== Andover ===
After retiring from the Saint John Vocational School in 1948 Gillett returned to Andover, joining her recently widowed sister and parents in the family home. She and her sister opened a shop selling Gillett's paintings as well as a wide variety of craft works including hand-printed fabrics. They closed the shop in 1959.

Gillett painted four murals for Trinity Anglican Church in Andover. The murals, which were unveiled in 1966, illustrate: on the southeast wall, various children's hymns; on the northeast wall, the hymn All Things Bright and Beautiful, and on the other walls, "New Testament scenes set in recognizably local, New Brunswick landscapes.

She wrote and illustrated two children's books; Where the Wild Flowers Grow and In Fields and Woods. In the late 1960s, she wrote and illustrated monthly columns entitled "In the Country" in the Atlantic Advocate magazine.

In 1969, Gillett lost 90% of her eyesight due to macular degeneration, but continued artistic activity despite her limitations. She died in January 1996.

== Style and works ==
Artistic aims

“My aims – what they are – are not perhaps high. I do not think of my art works – as it seems is the fashion nowadays – as having a socially significant message – unless [it is] in trying to tell in my work, of beauty I have felt or observed, and so to bring it to the attention of others, [so it] does good to mankind and has some social value. If what I have said in my art, or have fostered in my teaching, carries into the world a sense of greater happiness and beauty in my day, then all my aims will be gratified” - Violet Gillett.

Selected works

Freedom from Want, June 1944

This sculpture is a painted plaster that was produced in response to Franklin D. Roosevelt's 1941 Four Freedoms speech. Gillett's inspiration and rationale behind this piece was to include both food and love through mother and the child, symbolizing differing freedoms from want. This piece is part of the New Brunswick Museum collection.

"Where the Wild Flowers Grow," 1966 and "In the Fields and Woods," 1967

She wrote both of these children's books which contained her artwork.

Winter Night, Old Methodist Church, Andover, N.B.

This is a linocut artwork on paper in white and blue paint. It was included in Maritime Art: A Canadian Art Magazine in December–January 1942 – 1943.

== Honours ==
- Member of the Order of Canada (1976)
- New Brunswick Teacher's Centennial Award (1976)
- Queen's Jubilee Medal (1977)
- Governor General's Medal (1977)

== Bibliography ==
- In fields and woods. Brunswick Press. 1967. OCLC 70433574.
- Where wild flowers grow. Brunswick Press. 1966. OCLC 63551000.
