= Gerald Ferguson =

Canadian-American conceptual artist and painter

- Born: January 29, 1937; Cincinnati, Ohio, United States
- Died: October 8, 2009 (aged 72); Halifax, Nova Scotia, Canada
- Known for: conceptual artist, painter
- Awards: Canada Council for the Arts Molson Prize, 1995

Gerald Ferguson (January 29, 1937 – October 8, 2009) was a conceptual artist and painter who lived and taught in Halifax, Nova Scotia. Born in Cincinnati he was both a Canadian and US citizen. After receiving his MFA from Ohio University, Ferguson taught at Wilmington College and Kansas City Art Institute before coming to Canada in 1968, invited to teach at Nova Scotia College of Art and Design (NSCAD) in Halifax. He continued to teach at NSCAD until his retirement in 2006.

== Work ==
When Ferguson started teaching at the NSCAD, he removed all the easels in the studio. He developed his conceptual approach to painting, what the Dalhousie Art Gallery curator Susan Gibson Garvey refers to as "literal, task-oriented paintings." With NSCAD president Garry Neill Kennedy, Ferguson helped establish NSCAD as an important centre for conceptual art, noted for his role in the idea of "the dematerialization of the art object" in Lucy Lippard's influential history of conceptualism Six Years: The Dematerialization of the Art Object from 1966 to 1972. Critic Gary Michael Dault describes Ferguson's teaching at NSCAD as a "37-year trajectory...wherein he stubbornly, persuasively tilled the fields of the kind of conceptual art for which the college became primarily known." He additionally founded the NSCAD Lithography workshop between 1969 and 1976 and advocated for the establishment of the NSCAD Press.

His work is represented in numerous public and private collections in Canada, the US and Europe. Ferguson has had solo exhibitions at Dalhousie Art Gallery, Art Gallery of Ontario, Vancouver Art Gallery, Winnipeg Art Gallery and the National Gallery of Canada.

Ferguson has work in the collection of the National Gallery of Canada. Museum of Modern Art in New York and the Museum Sztuki, in Łódź, Poland. In 1972-73 he was a visiting professor at the California Institute of the Arts. His work has been regularly reviewed in national and international art journals and news media. In 1996, he was the recipient of 1995 Canada Council for the Arts Molson Prize. Ferguson retired from teaching in 2006. His estate is represented by Olga Korper Gallery in Toronto and CANADA in New York.
