= Jaime Angelopoulos =

Canadian sculptor based in Toronto

- Born: 1982 (age 43–44); Canada
- Education: Nova Scotia College of Art and Design (BFA); York University (MFA); Meadows School of the Arts
- Occupation: Sculptor
- Known for: Abstract gestural sculptures
- Notable work: Public installations at Contemporary Art Forum Kitchener and Area (CAFKA) and Supercrawl
- Awards: Plinth Sculpture Contest (2013)

Jaime Angelopoulos (born 1982) is a Canadian sculptor based in Toronto. She is noted for using abstract gestural shapes in her work.

== Early life and education ==
Angelopoulos received her MFA from York University in 2010. She holds a BFA from the Nova Scotia College of Art and Design (2005.) She also studied at the Meadows School of the Arts in Dallas.

== Career ==
Angelopoulos has worked out of a studio in Toronto since graduating from York University in 2010. She maintains a daily studio practice and begins her sculptural work through a drawing and writing practice. She has had residencies at the Banff Centre in Banff, Alberta, and KulttuuriKauppila Art Centre in Finland. In 2015, Angelopoulos had a residency at the Thames Art Gallery, from August 17–21 in the Audrey Mistele Art Studio, located inside the Chatham Cultural Centre. Angelopoulos comments on the place of art in public life.

== Work ==
Solo exhibitions have included the Parisian Laundry in Montreal, MKG127 in Toronto, YYZ Outlet in Toronto, and the Cambridge Galleries in Cambridge, Ontario. She has also exhibited as part of group exhibitions in Finland, Regina, and Oakville. Her works are also held in corporate, institutional and private collections.

Notable installations include a 5-meter high white and orange polka-dotted sculpture in Victoria Park in Kitchener, Ontario, as part of a month-long biennial Contemporary Art Forum Kitchener and Area (CAFKA) in 2016. She also had two installations as part of the 2015 edition of Hamilton, Ontario's Supercrawl.

Her drawings have inspired compositions by musical percussive performance by Ray Dillard.

== Awards ==
Angelopoulos was awarded the Plinth Sculpture Contest from the Hazelton Hotel for her work: "I See Through Them" (2011) in 2013.
