= Arounna Khounnoraj =

Canadian artist, teacher and author

- Born: Laos
- Education: Ontario College of Art; Nova Scotia College of Art and Design; University of Waterloo
- Spouse: John Booth
- Website: www.bookhou.com

Arounna Khounnoraj is a Canadian multi-disciplinary artist, teacher and author.

Khounnoraj immigrated with her family to Canada from Laos as a child. studied at the Ontario College of Art and Nova Scotia College of Art and Design, and has a Master of Fine Arts from the University of Waterloo.

Khounnoraj operates Bookhou, a Toronto-based business, with her husband John Booth. Launched as a studio in 2002, the couple opened a storefront in 2008 and operate as an online retailer. Specializing in home decor and accessories, the couple produce and sell items such as bags, furniture, artwork and ceramics. The name of the store is a portmanteau of the couple's surnames. It operates out of a building owned by the couple where they live with their two children.

Khounnoraj is credited with generating a renewed interest in punch needle embroidery after a video she posted utilizing the technique went viral. She has since run several work shops and published a book about the topic titled Punch Needle: Master the Art of Punch Needling Accessories for You and Your Home (2019). Her second book Visible Mending: A Modern Guide to Darning, Stitching and Patching the Clothes You Love was released in 2020. She's has since published several additional books focused on mending and embroidery.

== Bibliography ==
2019 - Punch Needle: Master the Art of Punch Needling Accessories for You and Your Home ISBN 9781787132788

2020 - Visible Mending: A Modern Guide to Darning, Stitching and Patching the Clothes You Love ISBN 9781787136090

2022 - Embroidery: A Modern Guide to Botanical Embroidery ISBN 9781787138315

2023 - Winter Celebrations: A Modern Guide to a Handmade Christmas ISBN 9781837830664

2023 - Contemporary Patchwork: Techniques in Colour, Surface Design & Sewing ISBN 9781644033753

== See also ==
- List of University of Waterloo people
