= Snook (comedian) =

Canadian comedian

Snook, the alter-ego of Pete Soucy, is a Newfoundland comedian and actor. He is the face of NLClassifieds.com.

== Pete Soucy ==
Peter "Pete" Soucy was born in Stephenville, Newfoundland and Labrador. Soucy moved with his family to Gander in 1969, where he attended school before eventually attending NSCAD in Nova Scotia.

Soucy taught High School Visual Arts for five years between 1983 and 1989, four years in Clarenville High School, Clarenville, NL, and one at Bishops College in St. John's.

Since 1986, Soucy has been acting, writing, designing, and directing for stage, radio and television. A graduate of the Nova Scotia College of Art and Design, Soucy later taught Visual Arts for several years in secondary schools. His most successful play, FLUX, has been adapted for television, published, and performed in several provinces and states.

In 1987, Soucy co-founded the Day Job Theatre. Since then, he has appeared in many television commercials and has completed a three-year term as Artistic Director of Rebel Island Theatre and the NaGeira Theatre Festival in Carbonear.

Soucy unsuccessfully ran for the Liberals in the 1999 provincial election. He lost to Jack Harris, who was leader of the NDP at the time.

Soucy subsequently hosted VOCM's Backtalk in St. John's, NL.

Following the resignation of Judy Foote as MP for Bonavista-Burin-Trinity in 2017, Soucy unsuccessfully ran for the Liberal party nomination; he lost narrowly to Churence Rogers.

=== Awards ===
- Newfoundland and Labrador Arts Council Award - 1986
- Kari Award - 1996

== Snook ==
Snook is Soucy's most popular character. The character has been described as "a street-smart corner boy" and is said to come from St. John's, Newfoundland. He has a recognizable slicked-back hairstyle and is usually seen holding a cigarette. Snook performs at various comedy festivals and venues, hosts television series, and has released several comedy CDs and DVDs. He also appeared in his own segment Stuff about Stuff, on the NTV Evening Newshour.

== Appearances ==
=== Television ===
CBC Here and Now - weekly commentaries for three seasons in the 1990s

- Wicked Night Out - (Host)
- Lorne Elliott's Madly Off in All Directions
- CBC Television's Canada Now
- Hatching, Matching and Dispatching - 2005 (Voice)
- Above and Beyond as Sadler - 2006 (mini-series)

NTV Evening Newshour - weekly commentaries continuing to the present

- Jake Thompson's "NL Now" - 2016

"NL Now" Christmas Special - 2017

- Also appeared on CBC's Son of a Critch as the policeman

=== Film ===
- Rare Birds as Bystander - 2001
- Young Triffie as Ranger Jenkins - 2006

=== Other ===
Snook is regularly hired to perform at special events, corporate functions, and in ad campaigns. One example is the act of 'Go Healthy' in Newfoundland and Labrador.

== Discography ==
=== DVDs ===
- Snook's Wicked DVD
- Snook's Christmas DVD

=== CDs ===
- Snook's Christmas (My Gift, Someone Else's Money) (2004)
- Snook's Childhood (or Snook ruins a bunch of Kids Songs) (2007)
- Another Snook's Christmas (Right Price, Easy to Mail) (2009)
