= Tim Zuck =

Canadian artist (1947–2022)

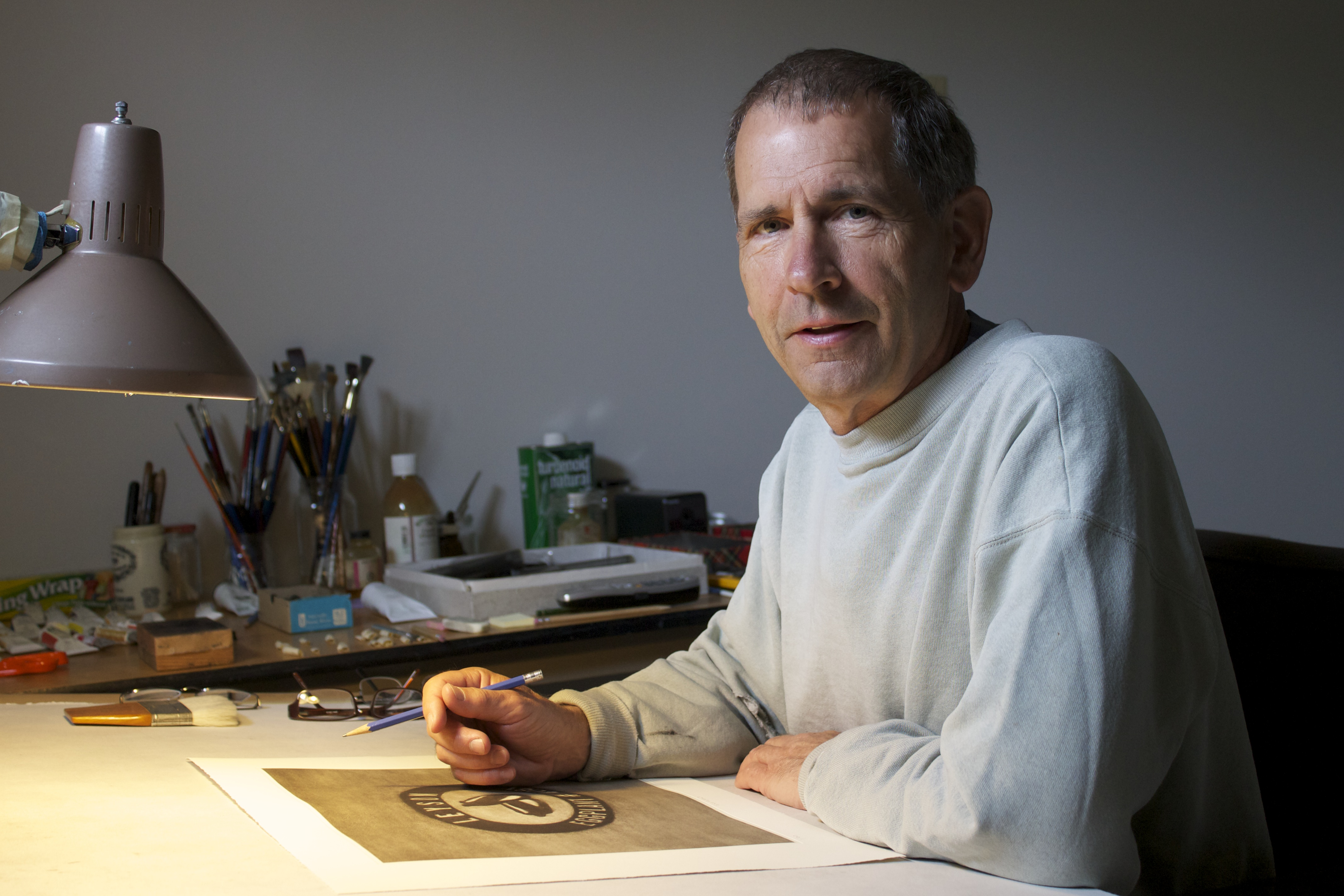
- Tim Zuck at his home studio
- Born: Timothy Melvin Zuck; November 18, 1947; Erie, Pennsylvania, U.S.
- Died: November 27, 2022 (aged 75); Lunenburg, Nova Scotia, Canada
- Education: BFA Nova Scotia College of Art and Design (1971); MFA California Institute of the Arts (1972)
- Spouse: Robyn Randell

Timothy Melvin Zuck (November 18, 1947 – November 27, 2022) was a Canadian painter of representational images with an orientation towards abstraction and a tranquil atmosphere distilled from the world around him. He was also an educator.

== Life ==
Timothy Melvin Zuck was born in Erie, Pennsylvania, in the United States. He attended Wilmington College, Ohio, from 1966–1967 and 1968–1969. At Wilmington, he majored in philosophy and psychology and studied art history and sculpture. For the year 1967–1968, he accompanied his parents in India as well as travelling on his own there. He has lived in Canada since 1969. He earned a BFA from the Nova Scotia College of Art and Design (NSCAD) in 1971 and an MFA from the California Institute of the Arts in Valencia, California in 1972.

After completing his graduate studies, Zuck returned to NSCAD in late 1972, and taught in the school until 1979. In 1975, he began to focus on small paintings as a reaction to the prevailing concept-oriented art at NSCAD. He has exhibited extensively in Canada since the 1970s, and has also shown in the United States and Japan. In 1997–1998, a major two-part exhibition was organized collaboratively by the MacLaren Art Centre in Barrie, which held a retrospective of drawings titled Tim Zuck: Still Life in Landscape, and the McMichael Canadian Art Collection in Kleinburg, which presented an overview of his paintings titled Tim Zuck: A Decade of Painting.

Zuck taught at the Alberta College of Art and Design from 2002 and was awarded Professor Emeritus status in 2015. Zuck died in Lunenburg, Nova Scotia on November 27, 2022, at the age of 75.

== Work ==
In the late 1970s and early 1980s, his images of boats, houses and people expanded into a wider range of forms that concerned him. He is sometimes associated with the New Image painters such as Eric Fischl. His work is included in such major public collections as the National Gallery of Canada; Art Gallery of Ontario; McMichael Canadian Art Collection; Vancouver Art Gallery; Winnipeg Art Gallery; Art Gallery of Nova Scotia; the Mendel Art Gallery; the Glenbow Museum, Calgary; and the Canada Council Art Bank. His work is represented by the Barbara Edwards Gallery in Toronto. Zuck's archives are held by the E. P. Taylor Research Library and Archives at the Art Gallery of Ontario.
