= Laurel Woodcock =

Canadian artist and academic (1960–2017)

- Born: October 22, 1960; Ottawa, Ontario, Canada
- Died: January 7, 2017 (aged 56); Toronto, Ontario, Canada
- Known for: Language-based works
- Style: Conceptual art

Laurel Elizabeth Woodcock (October 22, 1960 – January 7, 2017) was a Canadian artist and academic. She worked in many formats including installation, video, and sculpture.

== Biography ==
Laurel Woodcock was born in Ottawa, Ontario, and earned her MFA at the Nova Scotia College of Art and Design (Halifax, 1992) and BFA at Concordia University (Montreal, 1987). After establishing her career in Montreal, she moved to Toronto in 2000 to teach at the University of Guelph, Ontario, where she was the area coordinator for Extended Practices at the College of Arts.

== Exhibitions ==
A substantial survey exhibition of Woodcock's work was curated by Michelle Jacques at the University of Waterloo Art Gallery in 2012. Other solo exhibitions of her work have been held at the Art Gallery of Ontario (Toronto Now series, 2010), the Banff Centre (2006), Macdonald Stewart Art Centre (2004), the MOCCA (2003), the Agnes Etherington Art Centre (2001), Artcite (1996), and galerie Articule (1999 and 1994). Woodcock's work has been featured in numerous group exhibitions including at the Blackwood Gallery (2013) and the Contemporary Art Gallery, Vancouver (2006).

== Screenings ==
Woodcock's video works have been screened at festivals including Rencontre Internationale (Paris/Berlin, 2008), 25hrs (The Video Art Foundation, Barcelona, 2003), Cinema Naiveté (Available Light Collective, Ottawa, 2003), Images Festival (Toronto, 2003), Recent Canadian Video (Cairo, Egypt, 2002), and Canadian Fall (Glasgow, 1999).

== Works ==
Woodcock worked in a variety of media and art forms including immersive installation, video, multiples, text-based work, and neon. Her work has been noted for its playful engagement with the legacy of conceptualism, involving both humour and emotion, while engaging with theoretical issues. She often drew on language--playlists, book titles, flyleaves, turns of phrase, punctuation, commercial signage--to complicate linear readings and invite multiple interpretations of pop culture and the everyday. Her works include On a clear day, a sculpture in the collection of the Art Gallery of Ontario. Her work is also in the collections of the Agnes Etherington Art Centre and McCarthy Tétrault.
