= Michael Fernandes (artist) =

- Born: 1944 (age 81–82); Trinidad
- Known for: installation artist, performance artist, audio artist, artist who makes bookworks

Michael Fernandes (born in 1944) is a Canadian experimental artist and art educator based in Halifax, Nova Scotia. His work uses familiar, even banal materials to ask the viewer to confront the boundary between daily life and art.

== Early life ==
Fernandes was born in Trinidad. He emigrated to Canada to study at the Montreal Museum of Fine Arts in 1963. By 1973, Fernandes moved to Halifax to teach at the Nova Scotia College of Art and Design.

== Career ==
Initially a painter, Fernandes turned to installation and multimedia to create situations that actively solicit participation from the viewer. Fernandes' texts and interventions explore this intersection of private life with public space.

I want these works to continue to form after they are seen...Paintings seem to stay on the wall; my installation works are talking about a change that is active. You can go away and still work on it.

— Michael Fernandes

Fluxus suggested that everyday life should not be excluded from art. It encouraged a direct approach to creating work using the minimum amount of means required. Fernandes extends this approach to use everyday objects and experiences to provoke the viewer to make connections between the installation/performance and the spaces of the viewer's own life. It deliberately leaves room for the viewer to find their own approach to understanding the work, which can be uncomfortable for some.

His approach has been compared to that of Jimmie Durham, David Medalla and David Hammons—all use wit and humour to illuminate attitudes and pre-conceptions based on ethnicity or race.

Fernandes has little interest in preserving objects for posterity or in meeting the viewer's expectations. He is more concerned with an 'ephemeral expressive situation'. The challenge to the viewer is to return from Fernandes' work to experience the artistic moment in the viewer's own life.

He is an instructor in intermedia at NSCAD University.

== Exhibitions ==
He has exhibited extensively nationally, notably at the Blackwood Gallery, Mercer Union, The Power Plant, and YYZ (Toronto, ON); C.I.A.C. (Montreal Biennale); Articule, and Mai, (Montreal, QB), Dunlop Art Gallery (Regina, SK); The National Gallery of Canada, and Saw Gallery (Ottawa, ON); Art Gallery of Nova Scotia, Eye Level Gallery, and Mount Saint Vincent Art Gallery (Halifax, NS); and internationally at P.S.1 (New York, NY); Art Public Calaf (Barcelona, Spain); In The Context of Art Biennale (Warsaw, Poland). His work was included in Traffic: Conceptual Art in Canada 1965-1980, the nationally touring exhibition.

== Awards ==
- Governor General's Award in Visual and Media Arts (2020)
