= Paula Ann Gallant =

Murdered by strangulation

Paula Anne Gallant
- Born: Paula Anne Gallant; 5 December 1969
- Disappeared: 27 December 2005 (aged 36); Timberlea, Nova Scotia, Canada
- Body discovered: 28 December 2005
- Occupation: Schoolteacher
- Known for: Murder victim

Paula Anne Gallant (December 5, 1969 – December 27, 2005) was a Canadian school teacher who was murdered by asphyxiation due to strangulation. On December 27, 2005, Gallant and her husband, Jason MacRae were in their basement arguing about a debt from online gambling. After MacRae walked back down to the basement where Gallant was sitting at the computer, he hit her in the back of her head with a two-by-four wood board. He then proceeded to strangle her to the floor until she stopped moving and then wrapped her head with Saran Wrap to make sure she was dead.

== Early life and education ==
Gallant was a grade three teacher at Beechville Lakeside Timberlea School. Gallant was actively involved in her school and community, and art was one of her passions. She was pursuing her Certificate in Visual Arts at NSCAD.

== Disappearance ==
On December 27, 2005, shortly after 7:00PM her husband had contacted his wife's sister Lana Kenny to see if she knew of her whereabouts. At their house 45 minutes later MacRae contacted the Halifax Regional Police reporting that Gallant had not returned from Costco, since 2:00PM.

== Searches ==
Family and friends searched the community and called friends and neighbors trying to locate Gallant. At 12:30 a.m. on December 28, 2005, Gallant's car was located at the Beachville-Lakeside-Timberlea School where she taught a Grade 3 art class. The car was locked and her body was found in the trunk of her green 1997 Chevrolet Cavalier. She was wrapped in a blanket in a fetal position.

== Media coverage ==
Gallant's murder was covered locally and nationally throughout Canada. The family and MacRae were interviewed and profiled by The National and The Fifth Estate, in 2006. Her death was one of Nova Scotia's most high-profile unsolved homicides.

== Memorials ==
- The Paula Gallant Memorial Fund donated money to the Transition House Association of Nova Scotia. With the permission of Gallant's family, the Paula Gallant Modified Art Therapy Project for Survivors of Violence and Abuse was developed. Over 300 woman each year participate in the project.
- A children's book was written in her memory titled "Miss Gallant’s Favourite Season", by author Louise Christie
- On October 10, 2007, Gallant's sister street was named in her memory.
- The community of Timberlea, Nova Scotia has a memorial walk in Gallant's Memory, which began June 27, 2007, called "A Walk to Remember"
