= Wendy Geller =

Canadian feminist artist and educator

- Born: 1957; Winnipeg, Manitoba, Canada
- Died: 1996 (aged 38–39)
- Education: Nova Scotia College of Art and Design
- Notable work: 48-Hour Beauty Blitz, 1982
- Style: video art

Wendy Geller (1957–1996) was a Canadian video artist, graphic artist, and educator.

== Early life and education ==
Wendy Geller was born in Winnipeg, Manitoba in 1957. She received her B.F.A. from the Nova Scotia College of Art and Design (NSCAD) (1978-1982) where her work was largely in video and performance and she performed at the Centre for Art Tapes. Afterwards, she received her M.F.A. from the University of California, San Diego.

== Career ==
Geller worked as an assistant professor at the Kansas City Art Institute from 1987 to 1990. From 1992 to 1994, she was active as a member of the Women's Studio Workshop in Rosendale, New York.

== Work ==
Geller's video work often featured herself as a performer. Works such as 48-Hour Beauty Blitz (1982) examine cultural standards of feminine beauty from a feminist perspective. Her work has also been noted for its humorous perspective on gender and sexuality. Toward the end of her life, Geller produced small, hand-worked sculptures from found objects which she called "Shwabties", inspired by ancient Egyptian funerary figures, and created works on paper that took the form of illuminated pages from books, particularly medical texts. Critics have noted a shamanistic aspect of these later works.

Geller's video work is distributed by Video Pool in Winnipeg and Vtape in Toronto. Her work is in the collection of the National Gallery of Canada.

=== Major exhibitions ===
Retrospective exhibitions of Geller's work were held in 1998 at the St. Norbert Arts and Cultural Centre (Manitoba, Canada) and in 2003 at the Centre for Art Tapes and Dalhousie Art Gallery (Halifax). A posthumous overview of her video work titled Matter/Flesh/Spirit/Ground curated by James McSwain of the Centre for Art Tapes, Halifax was screened at the Winnipeg Art Gallery in 2005.

== Wendy Geller Fund ==
In her memory, and in dedication to her commitment to the art community, the Geller family has established the Wendy Geller Fund to assist Video Pool members in the completion of new media projects.
