= Sgoil Ghàidhlig an Àrd-Bhaile =

Sgoil Ghàidhlig an Àrd-Bhaile (The Gaelic Language Society of Halifax) promotes, provides and supports community-based, authentic Nova Scotia Gaelic language learning, within a cultural context, for people of all ages in the Halifax Regional Municipality. Sgoil Ghàidhlig’s language immersion courses utilize a methodology known as "Total Immersion Plus" (TIP), which was introduced to Nova Scotia by Finlay MacLeod of Comhairle nan Sgoiltan Àraich, the Scottish Gaelic Preschools Association. Immersion courses of this type are also known as Gàidhlig aig Baile or "Gaelic in the Community".

Gàidhlig aig Baile instruction is currently offered in numerous Nova Scotian communities, and Sgoil Ghàidhlig an Àrd Bhaile offers the most extensive course timetables in the province. Gàidhlig aig Baile language courses and workshops teach students to speak and understand Gaelic through conducting everyday activities, games and conversation in a total immersion environment. Once students are functional in the language, they may learn to read and write Gaelic, either in continued immersion through Sgoil Ghàidhlig’s courses or through other methods.

Sgoil Ghàidhlig an Àrd-Bhaile is supported by the Province of Nova Scotia through the Office of Gaelic Affairs, and works in co-operation with the Office of Gaelic Affairs to develop and promote Gaelic resources for all Nova Scotians.
