= Walter Abell =

American art historian

Walter Halsey Abell
- Born: 1897; Brooklyn, New York, US
- Died: 1956 (aged 58–59); East Lansing, Michigan, US
- Occupations: Art teacher and theoretician

Walter Halsey Abell (1897–1956) was an American Art teacher and theoretician.

== Early years ==
Walter Halsey Abell was born in 1897 in Brooklyn, New York. The Barnes Foundation sponsored him to study in France. He became a teacher of art and an art theoretician, interpreting art from Marxist and psychological viewpoints. He taught at Antioch College in Yellow Springs, Ohio (1925–27).

== Career ==
Abell taught at Acadia University in Wolfville, Nova Scotia, Canada from 1928 to 1943. He was one of the first professors of fine art at a Canadian university. Abell helped to found the Maritime Art Association, and was founding editor of Maritime Art. The first issue of Maritime Art, the first magazine in Canada devoted to the visual arts, appeared in October 1940. The Carnegie Corporation provided a small grant to help with starting up, and the Maritime Art Association gave organizational support. Abell was editor, but Violet Gillett was responsible for production of the first issues.

In the late 1930s Abell saw Canadian modernists, particularly women such as Pegi Nicol and perhaps Paraskeva Clark, as a "very important group of young Canadian painters ... more important than the Group of Seven." André Charles Biéler organized the first conference of Canadian artists in Kingston, Ontario. Abell told the delegates at the Kingston conference that Canada was a "cultural plutocracy ... determined by a small group possessing great wealth." He proposed that experiments in children's art, folk art and amateur creative workshops were "movements of modern art that have broken old forms and prepared the way for new ones, with increasing emphasis upon the creative possibilities in the common man."

The Kingston conference led to the foundation of the Federation of Canadian Artists in 1941. The Federation was divided into regions, each with a regional organizer. Abell was head of the Maritimes region. Walter Abell's journal Maritime Art became Canadian Art in 1943 when Abell moved to Ottawa to join the staff of the Art Centre of the National Gallery of Canada. Abell moved on to Michigan State University where he taught from 1943 to 1956. He died in 1956 in East Lansing, Michigan.

== Writings ==
- Representation and Form: A Study of Aesthetic Values in Representational Art. New York: Scribners, 1936
- Canadian Aspirations in Painting. Quebec: Culture, 1942
- Pleasure From Art : a Guide to Reading. Ottawa: Canadian Legion Educational Services, 1944
- Collective Dream in Art: A Psycho-Historical Theory of Culture based on Relations between the Arts, Psychology, and the Social Sciences. Cambridge, MA: Harvard University Press, 1957
