= Garry Kennedy =

Canadian artist (1935-2021)

Garry Neill Kennedy
- Born: Garry Neil Kennedy; November 6, 1935; St. Catharines, Ontario
- Died: August 8, 2021 (aged 85); Vancouver, British Columbia
- Education: Ontario College of Art; University at Buffalo; Ohio University
- Known for: Conceptual artist University administrator
- Partner(s): Jayne Kennedy (née Whitty; d. 2000); Cathy Busby

Garry Neill Kennedy, CM RCA (6 November 1935 – 8 August 2021) was a Canadian conceptual artist, educator and administrator from St. Catharines, Ontario. Kennedy worked at the Nova Scotia College of Art and Design (NSCAD) for over 40 years and was the president of the university from 1967–1990. During his tenure, Kennedy launched the school into an internationally renowned art institution, connecting Halifax with larger artistic centres, including New York's contemporary art scene. After retiring from this position, Kennedy continued to work at NSCAD as a full time professor until 2005, and part-time until 2011, all the while maintaining his own art practice. In the mid-1970s, Kennedy created works that investigated the processes and materials of painting, and in the first decade of the 2000s, he expanded his practice to investigate art and its social, institutional, corporate and political frameworks.

== Life ==
Garry Neill Kennedy was born in St. Catharines, Ontario. He studied at the Ontario College of Art (1960) and then earned his Bachelor of Fine Arts from the University at Buffalo (1963). He completed his Master of Fine Arts at Ohio University in 1965, and later that year he went on to teach in, and head, the fine art department of Northland College in Ashland, Wisconsin. In 1967, at the age of 32, he was appointed president of the Nova Scotia College of Art and Design (NSCAD), the youngest man to ever serve in that position. Kennedy was president of NSCAD for 23 years, until his resignation in 1990, after which he remained a full-time professor until 2005, and taught part-time until 2011. Throughout his career Kennedy also taught as a visiting professor at various art institutions, including California Institute of the Arts (CalArts), Los Angeles, California (1974–1975), N.Y. Institute of Technology, New York City, New York (1990), Beaux-Arts de Paris, Paris, France (1995), and Emily Carr University of Art and Design, Vancouver, British Columbia (2013). Kennedy had three children, John (Lorelei), Ainslie (Ian), and Peter (Laura), with his first wife, Jayne Kennedy (née Whitty). Garry and Jayne met as a teenagers in St. Catharines and were married from 1959 until Jayne passed away in 2000. After Garry met his second wife, Cathy Busby, they lived in Ottawa and Halifax before eventually moving to Vancouver to teach at the University of British Columbia in 2014. Kennedy and Busby worked closely alongside one another as artists and educators up until Kennedy died in Vancouver on August 8, 2021, after years of battling dementia.

== Work ==
Kennedy has been called a "near-legendary figure in the Canadian conceptual art scene" for his contributions to this area in both his art practice and as head of NSCAD. Continually bringing a sly sense of humour to his work, Kennedy's early practice ranged from deconstructionist material studies in painting in the 1970s like his Untitled canvas studies from 1975 in which he traced the dominant weaves of stretched canvases with a graphite pencil, to more conceptual but equally as rigorous practices, such as his Remembering Names series that Kennedy returned to intermittently between the early 1970s and 2018, which entailed "trying to remember the names of all the people he had ever known was a way of taking stock." In the 1980s onwards, Kennedy transitioned into making larger scale works based on the criticism of institutional power ranging from office politics, in works like E (1980) and Finchwell Revisited (1985/2016), to corporate greed and government authority, in The Big Five (2014) and Ya Ummi, Ya Ummi (2017). These later works frequently took the form of large-scale wall-text paintings, such as QUID PRO QUO (2012), and were often done in his signature adaptation of the Superstar Shadow type face, including a number of the works in his Ethics 101 series, such as AN EYE FOR AN EYE (2005).

=== Exhibitions ===
Garry Neill Kennedy exhibited extensively nationally and internationally with solo exhibitions at venues such as the Art Gallery of Ontario, the Art Gallery of Nova Scotia, the National Gallery of Canada, Museum of Contemporary Canadian Art (MOCCA), the 49th Parallel Gallery (New York City, New York), the Tasmanian School of Art Gallery (Hobart, Australia), Galeri II (Reykjavik, Iceland), and Portikus (Frankfurt am Main, Germany). Kennedy has also been included in over twenty group exhibitions shown in at museums and galleries, including the Museum of Modern Art (New York City, New York), the National Gallery of Canada, the Art Gallery of Ontario, Mass MoCA (North Adams, Massachusetts), and Art Cologne (Cologne, Germany).

In 1996, Garry Neill Kennedy: Wall Paintings and Related Works 1974–1995 was exhibited at Owens Art Gallery (Mount Allison University, Sackville, New Brunswick) with an accompanying publication by the same name. This exhibition traveled to Portikus (Frankfurt am Main, Germany) in 1998. In 2000, a major retrospective Garry Neill Kennedy: Work of Four Decades, was organized and circulated by the Art Gallery of Nova Scotia (Halifax, Nova Scotia) in partnership with the National Gallery of Canada (Ottawa, Ontario). The exhibition was shown at both institutions as well as Beaverbrook Art Gallery (Fredericton, New Brunswick) between 2000–2001. In 2017, the MacKenzie Art Gallery in Regina held Garry Neill Kennedy: Ya ummi Ya ummi curated by Timothy Long. In 2018, his exhibition Remembering Names was held at the CSA Space, Vancouver. It was a project conceived in the early 1970s, and repeated several times in the following decades, in which he attempted to recall and record the names of people he has met since childhood. Garry Neill Kennedy: The Big Five, in which Kennedy reassigned the colour schemes of the corporate logos of the five biggest banks in Canada, was initially shown at Emerson Gallery in Berlin in 2014, then exhibited at the Victoria Arts Council Gallery in 2020.

=== Collections ===
Public collections which hold Kennedy's work include the Museum of Modern Art, the Art Gallery of Ontario, the National Gallery of Canada, the Vancouver Art Gallery, the Glenbow Museum, Owens Art Gallery, Art Gallery of Nova Scotia, Dalhousie Art Gallery, and Canada Council for the Arts.

== Awards ==
Garry Neill Kennedy has been the recipient of a number of awards over his career, including significant recognition over the last few decades. In 2000, Kennedy was awarded the Portia White Prize by the Arts Council of Nova Scotia. In 2003, Kennedy was made a Member of the Order of Canada by Governor General Adrienne Clarkson for his contributions as an administrator, educator and artist, enriching Canada's cultural legacy. In 2004, Kennedy received a Governor General's Award in Visual and Media Arts. His jury citation called him "one of the most distinguished figures in Canadian art. Not only has he produced a body of conceptual painting that is recognized internationally, he was also instrumental in establishing an international reputation for the Nova Scotia College of Art and Design, of which he was the innovative head for 23 years." In 2009, Kennedy was nominated for the Nova Scotia Masterworks award for The Colours of Citizen Arar. In 2011, he received a Doctor of Fine Arts (honoris causa) degree from NASCAD. In 2012, Kennedy received the Queen Elizabeth II's Diamond Jubilee Medal.

== Legacy ==
Kennedy's legacy as both a conceptual artist and an administrator continues to impact generations of artist, former NSCAD students and beyond, as well as the landscape of art education in Canada. Kennedy's work continues to be exhibited posthumously. In 2024, the Vancouver Art Gallery, with curatorial assistance from Cathy Busby, Kennedy's spouse, organized Horizons, an exhibition conceived as a conceptual art project by Kennedy in which landscape paintings are rehung so that the horizon lines are at the eye level of the artist, and when viewed together they form one continuous horizon line around the gallery walls. In 2025, Kennedy's work was exhibited alongside work from his personal art collection in the group show Ttnxten at Griffin Art Projects in North Vancouver.

== Publications ==
Throughout his life Garry Neill Kennedy produced a high volume of printed matter, in multiple "formats such as books, pamphlets, leaflets, sheets, cards, pageworks, posters, and wallpaper." As recorded by Peter Trepanier in Garry Neill Kennedy: Printed Matter 1971–2009 (2012), these publications ranged from self-published works to professionally produced artist books and edited collections. Kennedy's unique approach to making printed matter, to accompany his artwork and as a means of documenting his career as an educator, continues to pose alternate forms of publication making, blurring the lines between the commonly considered functions of both artist books and historical accounts. In a review about Kennedy's book The Last Art College: Nova Scotia College of Art and Design, 1968–1978 (20012), Cliff Eyland postulates that "Kennedy is proffering a new way to flesh out a life, that is, by situating oneself and one’s art within a community such that the artist himself almost disappears, and (this is important) by creating beautifully designed documentation. Maybe The Last Art College is the first major socially-networked retrospective book about art." For Kennedy, making publications and printed matter was both an artistic practice and a way to document and archive the impacts of one's work and networks.

=== Selected works ===
- Kennedy, Garry Neill (2012). The Last Art College: Nova Scotia College of Art and Design, 1968-1978. Cambridge, Mass.: The MIT Press. ISBN 9780262016902.
- Trepanier, Peter and Garry Neill Kennedy (2012). Garry Neill Kennedy: Printed Matter 1971–2009. Ottawa, ON: National Gallery of Canada. ISBN 978-0-88884-902-1. Retrieved 2025-10-21.
- Kennedy, Garry Neill (2006). Garry Neill Kennedy: Superstar Shadow. London, ON: Museum London. ISBN 1-897215-09-6. Retrieved 2025-10-20.
- Kennedy, Garry Neill (2000). Garry Neill Kennedy: work of four decades. Halifax, NS: Art Gallery of Nova Scotia. ISBN 0-888-71-596-X. Retrieved 2025-10-21.
- Kennedy, Garry Neill (1998). Garry Neill Kennedy: Wall Paintings And Related Works 1974-1995. Frankfurt am Main, Germany: Portikus. ISBN 3-928071-42-4. Retrieved 2025-10-20.
- Kennedy, Garry Neill (1996). Garry Neill Kennedy: Wall Paintings And Related Works 1974-1995. Sackville, NB: Owens Art Gallery. ISBN 0-88828-132-3. Retrieved 2025-10-20.
- Kennedy, Gary Neill (1997). ""The Nova Scotia College of Art and Design and the Sixties: A Memoir."". Canadian Literature (152 (Spring/Summer 1997)): 192–204.
- Kennedy, Garry Neill (1978). Garry Neill Kennedy: Recent Work. Toronto, ON: The Art Gallery of Ontario. Retrieved 2025-10-21.
