= Rob MacInnis =

Canadian artist

- Born: Halifax, Nova Scotia, Canada
- Occupation: Artist
- Known for: Series of photographs of farm animals
- Website: robmacinnis.com

Rob MacInnis (born in Halifax, Nova Scotia) is a Canadian artist, known for his series of photographs of farm animals. In addition to photography he makes conceptual, sound, and installation art.
