= Henry M. Rosenberg =

Canadian artist (1858-1947)

- Born: Henry Mortikar Rosenberg; February 28, 1858; New Brunswick, New Jersey
- Died: December 24, 1947 (aged 89); Citronelle, Alabama
- Education: with Frank Duveneck in Munich (1878), Paris and Florence (1879), and Venice (1880); with James McNeill Whistler, Venice (1880)
- Spouse: Emily Scarfe (m. 1909)
- Awards: Honorary President of the Nova Scotia Society of Artists
- Elected: charter member of the Nova Scotia Museum of Fine Arts (now the Art Gallery of Nova Scotia) (1908)

Henry M. Rosenberg (known also as Henry Mortikar Rosenberg; February 28, 1858 – December 24, 1947) was a painter whose style varied from realism to tonalism, symbolism and impressionism, as well as a printmaker and educator. He was Principal of the Victoria School of Art and Design (now known as NSCAD) from 1898 to 1910. Rosenberg never stopped experimenting; absorbing realism, tonalism, impressionism, symbolism, and even post-impressionism. Writers on the history of art in Nova Scotia call him the "grand old man of Nova Scotian art".

== Career ==
Rosenberg, a first generation Polish-American by birth, was born in New Brunswick, New Jersey, and grew up in Chicago where he first studied art. He then travelled with his teacher Frank Duveneck and other students to Munich (1878), Paris and Florence (1879), and Venice (1880), and studied informally with James McNeill Whistler, during the summer of 1880 in Venice. Whistler interested him in etching, as well as in tonal painting which Rosenberg echoed in paintings later. Also during the five years Rosenberg was closely associated with John Singer Sargent and Arthur B. Davies. Rosenberg also worked at Pont-Aven with Gauguin. He exhibited at the Paris Salon in 1885.

After five years abroad, he moved back to Chicago where he worked on the huge panorama of the Battle of Gettysburg and shared a studio with artist Warren Davis. Then he moved to New York, where he opened a studio and associated with American impressionists known as "The Eight". He contributed to the first exhibition at the Macbeth Gallery in New York opened by William Macbeth in 1892 to exhibit only American paintings, and in two subsequent exhibitions. He also showed his work at the Pennsylvania Academy of Fine Arts, the Boston Art Club, the Art Institute of Chicago and the Brooklyn Art Association. During his time in New York, he worked at the artists' colony at Arkville, New York in the Catskills. In 1896, he moved to Halifax, Nova Scotia, where he became Principal of the Victoria School of Art and Design (now known as NSCAD) from 1898 to 1910. In Halifax, Rosenberg offered private lessons in his studio, including two artists, Edith Smith and Una Gray.

As principal, Rosenberg sought to improve the school as a training place for those concerned with the aesthetic value of art, not commercial art or applied graphic design. In 1903, he succeeded in moving the school to a larger, more well-known building, and in 1908 he became a charter member of the Nova Scotia Museum of Fine Arts (now the Art Gallery of Nova Scotia). In 1909, he married heiress Emily Scarfe and when her father, the town mayor, died, the couple settled into Edgemere, a Victorian mansion in Dartmouth. He resigned as Principal in 1910. After his resignation he continued to teach at the Victoria School of Art & Design as a special instructor in lithography and to paint in Halifax and Dartmouth, spending summers in Citronelle, Alabama, until 1934 when his wife died and he retired to Citronelle. He died in Citronelle, Alabama on the 24 December 1947.

== Selected exhibitions ==
- Pennsylvania Academy of Fine Arts (1883, 1891, and 1895 annual exhibitions);
- Paris Salon (1885), exhibited Consolation;
- Paintings, water colors and pastels by H.M. Rosenberg and Edward L. Field, on exhibition: Feb. 16-27, 1886 by Chase's Gallery;
- Boston Art Club (1888, 1891, 1895-96 annual exhibitions);
- Brooklyn Art Association (1891 annual exhibition);
- Art Institute of Chicago (1891, 1894 and 1897 annual exhibitions);
- first exhibition at the Macbeth Gallery, New York, opened by William Macbeth to exhibit only American paintings (1892), and in two subsequent exhibitions;
- Royal Canadian Academy (annual exhibitions, 1905-1921);
- Art Association of Montreal (spring exhibition, 1906);
- Ontario Society of Artists (annual exhibitions, 1915-1923);
- Nova Scotia Society of Artists (annual exhibitions, 1930-1935);
- Reinvention : the art and life of H.M. Rosenberg, curated by Mora Dianne O'Neill (2012);
- Canada and Impressionism: New Horizons, travelling exhibition (2020-2022)
- Jawbone Corner: Watercolours of Henry M. Rosenburg, exhibition from the collection of the Art Gallery of Nova Scotia (2025);

== Selected public collections ==
- Art Gallery of Nova Scotia;
- Dalhousie University, Halifax;
- Dartmouth Heritage Museum, N.S.;
- Delaware Art Museum;
- Mobile Museum of Art;
- National Gallery of Canada;
- Nova Scotia Museum, Halifax

== Record sale prices ==
At the Cowley-Abbott Auction titled An Important Private Collection - Part II, June 8, 2023, lot #139, Girls Gathering Firewood (circa 1886), oil on canvas, signed and inscribed “Halifax” lower left, 20 x 24 ins ( 50.8 x 61 cms ), auction estimate: $6,000.00 - $8,000.00, realized a price of $26,400.00.

== Bibliography ==
- O'Neill, Mora Dianne (2012). Reinvention: the Art and Life of Henry M. Rosenberg. Halifax: Art Gallery of Nova Scotia.
- Cronin, Ray (2023). Halifax Art & Artists: An Illustrated History. Toronto: Art Canada Institute.
