= Halifax Independent School =

Coordinates: 44.65042°N 63.61155°W

Location
- 3331 Connaught Avenue; Halifax, Nova Scotia, B3L 3B4; Canada

Information
- School type: Private
- Opened: 1974
- Head teacher: Heather Johnson
- Staff: ~18
- Grades: Pre-school - grade 9
- Enrolment: 180 (2026)
- Student to teacher ratio: 8:1
- Website: halifaxindependentschool.ca

The Halifax Independent School (HIS) is an independent, coeducational day school with a curriculum from pre-school through grade 9. It is located in Halifax, Nova Scotia, Canada.

== Origins ==
2004 – Halifax Independent School
1998 – Halifax Independent Elementary School
1992 – The Dalhousie Cooperative School
1974 – Dalhousie University, Faculty of Education - Dalhousie University Elementary School
