= Audrey Dear Hesson =

Canadian artist

Audrey Dear Hesson (born 1929 in Halifax, Nova Scotia) is a Canadian practical craft artist, mainly working with pottery, sculpture, jewelry and textile. She is a member of the Canadian Women Artists History Initiative and was the first black Canadian to graduate from the Nova Scotia College of Art. She is the only living artist in the exhibition curated by David Woods called Discovery: African Nova Scotian Art Pioneers.

== Early life ==
Hesson was born and grew up in Halifax's north end. In grade nine, she was encouraged to pursue art by her art teacher, the Bedford artist Elizabeth Tolson, who submitted her early art work for the high school art classes at the Nova Scotia College of Art.

== Studies ==
After graduating from Queen Elizabeth High School, she studied at Nova Scotia College of Art and Design from 1947 to 1951. Hesson majored in crafts and was part of the first graduating class in the college's new art education program, which prepared her to be a professional artist. In 1951, she was the first black graduate of the Nova Scotia College Art and Design.

== Later life ==
In 1957, Hesson and her husband (who was in the navy) planned to have their first child. She decided to put her art career on hold to be a housewife. In 1988, her art was rediscovered by the curator David Woods.

== Work ==
Hesson worked in jewellery, metalwork, woodcarving and pottery. When she was a student in college, she made her first art work, commissioned to make a grey Moroccan leather case to be presented to Princess Elizabeth and the Duke of Edinburgh upon their visit to HMCS Ontario.

Hesson mainly worked with jewellery and textile, but more focused on leather crafting and sculpture. Her work represents a wide array of craft-based works.

== African Art Pioneers ==
The Evergreen House museum in Dartmouth hosted an exhibit called African Maritime Art Pioneers, curated by David Woods. Hesson was one of the artists highlighted in the exhibit. Woods said that "Hesson's works has been exhibited in the past, but never with the other trailblazers of African Maritime arts".

== Legacy ==
Hesson's works were exhibited along with other notable African-Maritime artists such as Edward Mitchell Bannister and Edith MacDonald-Brown.
