= William John Leech =

Irish painter (1881–1968)

William John Leech (10 April 1881 – 16 July 1968) was an Irish painter and impressionist. Developed and encouraged by Walter Osborne, Leech came to critical attention for his landscapes and interiors, particularly those in Concarneau in Brittany. He is better known today for his works that feature his first wife, Saurin Elizabeth, and which include A Convent Garden, Brittany (1913) and The Sunshade (1913). Leech was once mistakenly attributed as the artist for The Goose Girl. Leech's painted works never achieved the public attention that critics believed they merited, a fact partly attributed – even by Leech himself – to his highly reclusive nature, and also to his need for personal privacy due to his second relationship with May Botterell.

== Early life and education ==
Leech was born on the 10th of April 1881 in Parnell Square in Dublin, the son of Anne Louisa née Garbois (1847–1921) and the Trinity Law Professor, Henry Brougham Leech (1843–1921). He went to school at St Columba's College, and in 1899 enrolled at the Dublin Metropolitan School of Art. Rejecting the normal career route of becoming an art teacher, in 1900, he transferred to the Royal Hibernian Academy to further study under major Irish artists and particularly Walter Osborne, who Leech credited as teaching him everything that he "needed to know about painting".

By 1901, Leech had perfected his use of Osbourne's techniques of "drawing directly in paint on the canvas", and the "bold use of impasto combined with flickering light and shade", and "a late predilection for watercolour". Leech was also influenced by Nathaniel Hone and his small outdoor paint sketches to capture light and colour that were scaled up in the studio, and by James McNeill Whistler and his techniques of balancing of tones and colours.

In 1901, with the support of Osborne, Leech left Dublin for Paris to enrol at the Académie Julian in Paris, where he studied under William-Adolphe Bouguereau who emphasised "restrained brushwork" and "finish", and later under Jean-Paul Laurens, who emphasised use of colour. While in Paris, he shared accommodation with the New Zealand artist Sydney Thompson, who would become a lifelong friend of Leech.

== Career as artist ==
=== Concarneau ===
Leech returned to Dublin in 1902 but in 1903 left to join his friend Thompson in the French sea-side town of Concarneau in Brittany, which had an established "artistic colony". Leech was largely based at Concarneau from 1903 to 1910, and during that period his artistic style developed markedly. He started with "formal academic 'brown studies' in dark Dutch style with a restricted palette of earth tones, with notable examples being Interior of a café (1908) and Le Café des artistes–Concarneau, which was awarded a bronze medal at the 1914 salon of the Societe des Artists. By the end of the period, Leech had completely transitioned to "landscapes in Whistlerian subdued tonalities", and was using a "bright post-impressionist palette".

Leech's portraits were considered too realistic and unforgiving to make him a "society portrait painter", however, his French landscapes and shop and cafe interiors won him numerous Royal Dublin Society Taylor prizes and scholarships, and established him as an important emerging Irish artist.

On his first return to Dublin from Brittany in 1906, he was embraced into the artistic circle of George Russell (A.E.), Constance Gore-Booth and her husband Casimir Dunin Markievicz. Leech exhibited nearly seventy paintings with them in a group exhibition at the Leinster Lecture Hall in August 1907 and was praised by the noted critic, Thomas Bodkin. In December 1909, Leech exhibited with Jack Yeats, Albert Power, Eva Hamilton, William Orpen, Lily Williams, A.E., Constance Gore-Booth and Dermod O’Brien, in the first Aonach art exhibition, organised by Sinn Féin as part of the Irish Festival at the Rotunda. In 1910, he became a full member of the Royal Hibernian Academy, but then followed his parents who were relocating to London.

=== Elizabeth as subject ===
A Convent Garden, Brittany (1913)

During late 1910, Leech toured Europe painting landscapes, and particularly the Aosta Valley in Italy and Lake Constance in Switzerland. He also rented a large house outside Concarneau with an affluent American married artist, Saurin Elizabeth Kerlin née Smith (1879–c1951), (Note: Daughter of Katherine Howard Lane and Francis Stribling Smith, born Jan 1879 in St Louis, Missouri, USA. She married first Fentress Gordon Kerlin (1864-1916), their daughter was Fentress Saurin Kerlin, (1897–1979). Katherine was the daughter of Rev. Saurin Eliot Lane (1818–1904).) with whom Leech had begun an affair.

After Elizabeth's divorce was finalised, they married in June 1912 at the Fulham registry office and lived with Leech's parents in London, but continuously visited Concarneau. It was in this period, with Elizabeth as the subject, that Leech painted some of his most notable works, including the Girl with a Tinsel Scarf (1912), A Convent Garden, Brittany (1913) with its "acid-green" colouring, The Sunshade (1913), and The Cigarette (1915). In A Convent Garden, Elizabeth poses as a novice of the Daughters of the Holy Spirit in the walled garden of their hospital at Concarneau, where Leech had once convalesced.

While they would begin to separate after two years of marriage, Elizabeth remained an important person in Leech's life until about 1919. She fulfilled the roles of wife, artist model and source of income (from her private wealth). When Leech was called up in 1918 for national service his marriage was falling apart. Leech returned from his service in the army both penniless and suffering from depression, which resulted in an acute state of artist's block.

=== Later years ===
In about 1919, Leech was commissioned by a London solicitor Percy Dumville Botterell (1880–1950), to paint a portrait of his wife May née Pearson (1881–1965). Leech painted a sharp black-and-white portrait of May titled Dame en noir, followed by Portrait bleu, which won a bronze medal at the 1922 Paris Salon. May quickly became Leech's lover and model, which finally ended his relationship with Elizabeth. May used a family allowance to move to a house in London near Leech, however they kept the relationship private, and only married in 1953 after the deaths of both Elizabeth and of Percy.

Leech and Botterwell travelled frequently together and particularly to the south of France and Nice, where Leech continued to paint. Return trips to Concarneau were made, often with his friend Thompson, and Leech also painted female nudes in watercolours with Botterell as subject. In 1925-26, Leech made his first and only sculpture, a bronze casting of May's head. By the late 1930s, a lack of sales and money, amplified by the privacy under which Leech and Botterell were living, forced Leech to remain in England, painting landscapes in Devon and Kent and scenes in London.

A series of major exhibitions in Dublin in 1945, 1947 and 1951, organised by Leo Smith in the Dawson Street Gallery revived interest in Leech's works and his energy and enthusiasm for painting. In 1958, Leech and May moved to the Tudor-style Candy Cottage in West Clandon in Surrey, where Leech continued to work. In 1965, May died of bronchial pneumonia which drove Leech into a depression. In July 1968, Leech was badly injured from a fall in a possible suicide attempt on West Clandon railway bridge, but Leech succumbed to his injuries shortly after.

== Legacy ==
Despite his critical acclaim and prizes at major exhibitions, Leech's wider artistic profile suffered from his need for privacy, which was amplified by his long affair with May Botterell. In one of his last letters Leech himself wrote, "You see not much success really but you cannot be a recluse all your life as I have been and have worldly success. I had a belief when young that if the work was good enough it would sell in the end."

In 1996, the National Gallery of Ireland (NGI) announced that it had incorrectly attributed Leech as the artist of the highly popular painting, The Goose Girl, a c. 1921 painting in its collection that had the initials "WL" inscribed on the back of the canvass. The NGI announced that new information led them to a "definitive reattribution of the painting" to Sheffield artist, Stanley Royle. Leech's best-known works remain that of his first wife, Elizabeth, and include A Convent Garden, Brittany (1913) and The Sunshade (1913), both of which hang in the NGI. In 2012, a national poll conducted by Ireland's State broadcaster, RTÉ, listed A Convent Garden, Brittany in the top ten of "Ireland's Favourite Painting".

In 2013, Franch art historian Claudine Dauphin, writing in the Dictionary of Irish Biography, said of Leech, "Lack of sales and hence of success made him the most neglected of Irish artists, owing a facile popularity to three paintings in the NGI (In a convent garden, The sunshade, and The goose girl (the last attributed to Stanley Royle in 1996)), but his versatility (which commands admiration) was largely unrecognised". Dauphin added that, "In fact, he was one of the most important and complex Irish artists of the modern era. He epitomises Irish painting from the Edwardian period to the mid-twentieth century, combining the teachings of the old masters with the innovations of the impressionists and post-impressionists, and absorbing the influences of British painters while developing an ever-changing, dynamic, and personal art".

== See also ==
- Jack B. Yeats
