= Elizabeth Styring Nutt =

British-Canadian artist and educator

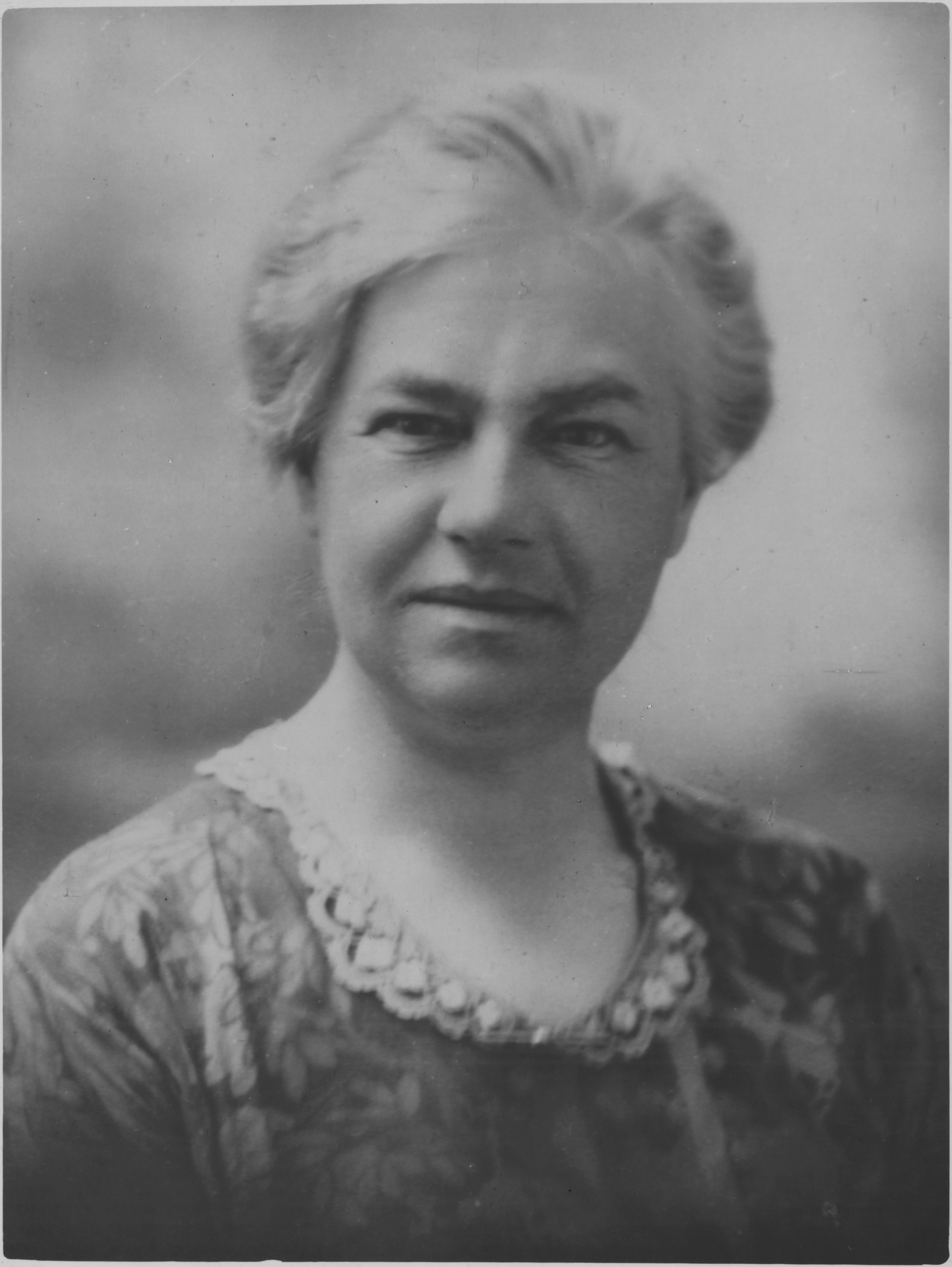
- Born: 1870; Onchan, Isle of Man
- Died: 1946 (aged 75–76); Sheffield, United Kingdom
- Known for: Painter, Educator

Elizabeth Styring Nutt (1870 – 1946), was an artist and educator, known for her leadership of the Nova Scotia College of Art in Halifax.

== Biography ==
Elizabeth Styring Nutt was born in Onchan, Isle of Man in 1870. Following the death of her father she moved to Sheffield. Nutt attended the Sheffield School of Art, Newlyn School of Art, and the Sorbonne. In 1914, she received her Masters of Arts at the University of Sheffield.

Nutt began her teaching career in Sheffield at the Firs Hill Branch Art School, then the Sheffield School of Art and the Sheffield Training College for Teachers. In 1919, Nutt accepted Arthur Lismer's offer to succeed him as the Principal of the Victoria School of Art and Design, becoming the second female principal after Katharine Evans. In 1925, Nutt changed the name of the school to the Nova Scotia College of Art. During her time, she faced controversy and was often opposed by faculty and students due to her conservative methods. One of her conflicts led to the dismissal of instructor, Stanley Royle, who later became the head of fine arts department at Mount Allison University. Despite controversy, Nutt was a strong supporter of the Nova Scotia Society of Artists, and went on to support many associations during her lifetime.

She remained at the Nova Scotia College of Art until 1943. During this time Nutt authored several books; Flower Drawing with the Children (1916), Significance (1921), The Why in the Drawing Lesson (1929), and The World of Appearance (1935).

Nutt was a founding member of the Maritime Art Association. She was also a founding member of the Nova Scotia Society of Artists, the Nova Scotia Society of Watercolour Painters, and an associate of the Royal Canadian Academy of Arts.

Nutt's work was exhibited at the Nova Scotia Society of Artists, the Royal Canadian Academy of Arts, the Ontario Society of Artists, the Art Association of Montreal, the Sheffield Society of Artists, the Royal Academy of Arts (London), and the Paris Salon.

In 1945, Nutt returned to the United Kingdom. She died in Sheffield in 1946.

== Public collections ==
Her work is included in the collections of the Museums Sheffield, the Doncaster Museum and Art Gallery and the National Gallery of Canada.

== Bibliography ==
- Cronin, Ray (2023). Halifax Art & Artists: An Illustrated History. Toronto: Art Canada Institute.
- Tooby, Michael (1991). Our Home and Native Land: Sheffield's Canadian Artists. Sheffield: Mappin Art Gallery. Archived from the original on 2 August 2023.
