= Maritime Art Association =

The Maritime Art Association (1935–late 1960s?) was a Canadian regional alliance of art clubs and societies, public schools, universities, social organizations, service and civic groups, artists, art students and art appreciators. As the first organization of its type in Canada, the Association offered Maritimers a more democratic and populist arena than art associations in the rest of the country, which tended to be city-based and only a few were province-wide. The Association responded to the need for an active regional infrastructure in the arts; representing groups from Nova Scotia, New Brunswick and Prince Edward Island.

Walter Abell organized the Maritime Art Association while a professor of art at Acadia University in Wolfville, Nova Scotia. The MAA's constitution was ratified at the Association's first annual meeting held in Saint John, New Brunswick at the end of March 1935, and Abell was elected its president.

Violet Gillett succeeded Abell as president and edited the short-lived Maritime Arts Bulletin. Gillett's mission as president was to steer the organization from art appreciation, towards community involvement in art.

The Association's objective was: "to promote a knowledge and appreciation of art; to foster art activities in the Maritime Provinces by uniting for cooperative effort, all interested groups and individuals, by securing and offering for circulation, exhibitions of fine and applied art," as well as "arranging for lectures and for engaging in such other activities to promote these aims." The MAA attracted a membership of seventeen groups in fourteen centres within two years, and would continue to maintain these numbers for the coming decade. he creation of many local art societies, such as the Fredericton Art Club and another at Charlottetown, were the immediate result of the formation of the MAA.

Through the association's program of traveling exhibitions, lecture series, radio broadcasts on the arts, and various other activities, the Maritime Art Association positioned the arts to become an arena for regional discussion, appreciation and solidarity. The MAA's exhibition programme of about eight shows per year was its most effective instrument for aesthetic development. The MAA annual exhibition, with its wide variety of regional artists and enthusiastic newspaper coverage, was perhaps the most successful strategy for constructing the identity of the regional art community. Its lecture circuit of speakers from both within and outside the Maritimes was highly promoted by the MAA, and radio talks and later a slide collection would also be part of its cultural mandate.

Local squabbles and regional jealousies came to the forefront over the Association's performance during World War II. Other internal problems arose from the diverse resources of the member organizations; others were the result of ineptitude. Nevertheless, the MAA created an infrastructure for the promotion and dissemination of art in the Maritimes – despite or perhaps in recognition of the difficulties imposed first by the Depression and then by the Second World War.

== Maritime Art (Magazine) ==
With the aid of a grant from the Carnegie Corporation, Walter Abell started the publication Maritime Art in 1940. The magazine helped to spread news of artists' work; in three years, Abell edited and designed fifteen issues. Following the Kingston Conference in June 1941, the magazine was refocused and renamed to Canadian Arts in 1943, with the help of the National Gallery of Canada.
