= Canadian Art (magazine) =

Art magazine

- Editor: Jayne Wilkinson (to April 2021)
- Former editors: David Balzer Richard Rhodes Robert Ayre (1944-1949)
- Categories: Art
- Frequency: Quarterly
- Total circulation: 19,094 (December 2011)
- Founded: 1943
- Final issue: March 15, 2021
- Company: Canadian Art Foundation
- Country: Canada
- Based in: Toronto
- Website: canadianart.ca
- ISSN: 0825-3854

Canadian Art was a quarterly art magazine published in Toronto and focused on Canadian contemporary art. The magazine published profiles of artists, art news, interviews, editorials, and reviews of modern art exhibitions. Established in 1943 it was known as artscanada between 1968 and 1983.

== History ==
With assistance from the Carnegie Corporation, Acadia University professor Walter Abell established the Maritime Art Association's publication Maritime Art in 1940. Violet Gillett was also instrumental in the creation and production of the magazine. With assistance from the National Gallery of Canada the magazine changed its name to Canadian Art in 1943 focusing on Canadian and international art. Under the editorship of Paul Arthur and Barry Lord the name was changed to artscanada in 1967. In 1983, the publisher Society for Art Publications ceased operations and the name was changed back to Canadian Art.

Struggling financially, the magazine was purchased by Maclean Hunter and Key Publishers in 1984. Canadian Art has been owned by the Canadian Art Foundation since 1991, receiving charitable status in 1992. Richard Rhodes edited the magazine for 25 years, retiring in 2015. In the following year, David Balzer was appointed the interim editor-in-chief. Balzer stepped down at the end of March 2019 and Jayne Wilkinson was named Editor-in-Chief in May 2019.

In 1998 the magazine began co-sponsoring an art award, the Canadian Emerging Artist Prize, with Connor Clark Private Trust. For over a decade, the Canadian Art Foundation had organized the annual Reel Artists Film Festival, featuring documentaries on visual arts and artists.

On October 5, 2021, the Canadian Art Foundation's board of directors announced that Canadian Art was immediately ceasing all operations, citing financial concerns and revenue loss due to the COVID-19 pandemic as driving factors for the organization's closure; it had already ceased publication earlier in the year. The final issue, Spring 2021, had been published on March 15, 2021.
