= NSCAD University =

Public art school in Halifax, Nova Scotia, Canada

Coordinates: 44°38′58.02″N 63°34′26.23″W

- Motto: Head, Heart, and Hand
- Type: Public
- Established: 1887; 139 years ago
- Affiliations: UACC, CBIE, AICAD
- Endowment: $8.18 million (2020)
- President: David B. Smith (interim)
- Provost: Kyla Mallett
- Dean: Jacqueline Warwick (academic), Shawn Tracey (students)
- Academic staff: 85 (regular staff)
- Students: 789 (Fall 2026)
- Undergraduates: 727
- Postgraduates: 62
- Location: Halifax, Nova Scotia, Canada
- Campus: Urban
- Colours: Purple and green
- Website: nscad.ca

NSCAD University, also known as the Nova Scotia College of Art and Design (NSCAD), is a public art university in Halifax, Nova Scotia, Canada. The university is a co-educational institution that offers bachelor's and master's degrees. The university also provides continuing education services through its School of Extended Studies.

The institution was founded by Anna Leonowens in 1887 as the Victoria School of Art and Design. The school was later renamed the Nova Scotia College of Art in 1925. In 1969, the institution was renamed the Nova Scotia College of Art and Design and began to offer undergraduate degrees, becoming the first degree-granting art school in the country. The institution adopted its current name in 2003.

== History ==
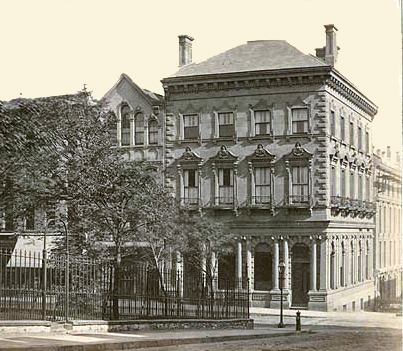
The school first opened in the Union Bank Building.

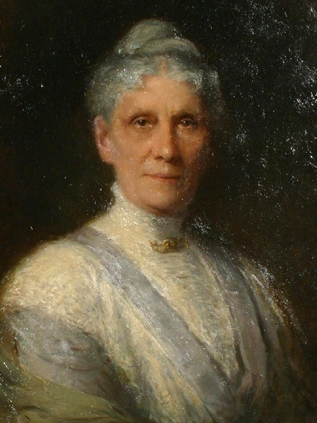
Anna Leonowens, founder

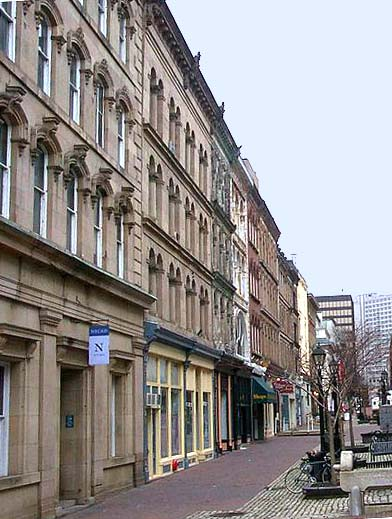
School buildings along Granville Street. The university owns the entire city block.

=== 19th century ===
The university opened in the Union Building in 1887. It was founded by Anna Leonowens (of Anna and the King of Siam fame). (Note: Soucy & Pearce (1993) give four "initiators" in ch. 1: Anna Leonowens, a Mrs. Jeremiah Kenny (first name not known), Ella Almon Ritchie, and Alexander McKay. However, speaking of Anna Leonowens, "Most people agree that the Victoria School of Art and Design was her idea." (p. 3)) It was originally called the Victoria School of Art and Design to commemorate Queen Victoria's Golden Jubilee. It moved to the Halifax Academy in 1890. From 1898 to 1910, Henry Mortikar Rosenberg was the principal.

=== 20th century ===
In 1903 the school moved to the old National School. In 1925, it was renamed the Nova Scotia College of Art (Note: "In 1925, thirty-seven years after it first received its charter, the Victoria School of Art and Design was no more.… a legislative act elevated the institution’s status to that of a college." (p. 94) "Along with the new status came a new name, the Nova Scotia College of Art, and a motto, 'Heart and Head and Hand.'" (p. 95)) under the leadership of its president Dr. Frederick Sexton. (Note: "When Sexton, as President, oversaw the Art College’s new Legislative Act of 1925,…" (p. 104))

One of the notable artists associated with the school in its early years was Arthur Lismer, who was a member of the Group of Seven and spent several years as the school president. Elizabeth Styring Nutt succeeded Lismar as president in 1919, serving until 1943.

New Brunswick-born artist Donald Cameron MacKay, who prior to World War II had been vice-principal, after war service assumed the role of principal and continued until retiring in 1971. Under his supervision, in 1957 the school moved into the former St. Andrew's United Church on Coburg Road. A modern, five-storey addition was constructed in 1968. It was eventually razed to provide space for Dalhousie University's Mona Campbell Building.

The artist Garry Kennedy was appointed president in 1967 at the age of 31, becoming the youngest ever president of a Canadian university. He immediately moved to remake the college from a provincial art school into an international centre for artistic activity. He invited notable artists to come to NSCAD as visiting artists, particularly those involved in conceptual art. Artists who made significant contributions during this period include Vito Acconci, Sol LeWitt, Dan Graham, Eric Fischl, Lawrence Weiner, Joseph Beuys and Claes Oldenburg. The school was renamed the Nova Scotia College of Art and Design in 1969, the same year it began granting undergraduate degrees. Kennedy is credited with transforming the school into an internationally recognised centre for cutting-edge art, with Art in America suggesting in 1973 that NSCAD was "the best art school in North America".

The school began to offer graduate programs in 1973. It moved to its current location on Granville Mall in 1978 and the former Coburg Road campus was acquired by Dalhousie University. Garry Kennedy retired from the school's presidency in 1990 to focus on teaching and making art. In August 1984, New Wave alternative rock band Sonic Youth, were invited by frequent collaborator and NSCAD Alumni artist/instructor Dan Graham, for a two-week Artist in Residence. The band performed a free show, organized by Gordon Laurin, on August 9, 1984.

=== 21st century ===
In 2002 the school purchased the Granville Street block of heritage buildings it had leased since 1978, known today as the Fountain Campus. The institution was renamed NSCAD University in 2003. It opened a second campus, the Academy Building, in 2004. This campus houses the film studies faculty. In 2007 the third campus, the Port Campus, opened at the Halifax Seaport. All three campuses are located in downtown Halifax.

The construction of the Port Campus brought the school's debt to a high of $19 million in 2011 after funding from the federal government fell through. The province asked the school to draw up a plan to reduce the debt, and it was speculated that NSCAD might lose its autonomy. NSCAD students, faculty and alumni mounted a "Save NSCAD" campaign in opposition to a merger with a larger institution. The school commissioned a report to study the idea, but the consultant found that a merger would not result in cost savings. The NSCAD board of governors therefore voted on 15 July 2014 to continue as an independent university. The university's financial position subsequently improved, and the debt had been reduced to $13 million as of 2015.

In February 2026 the NSCAD student union were the first to vote yes to join the one week provincial student strike proposed by the Nova Scotia chapter of the Canadian Federation of Students. This was the first Canadian student strike to occur outside of Quebec. They were joined by students at Acadia University, Saint Mary's University, Dalhousie University, and University of Kings College. The strike lasted from March 15 until March 21, with the main demands being divestment from fossil fuels, weaponry, and exploitation of resources on Indigenous land, and affordable tuition. The NSCAD student union also voted to include an accessibility demand for timely repair of elevators and printer access.

== Academics ==
NSCAD offers bachelor's degrees in Fine Art (BFA), Design (BDes), and Art History (BA). It also offers Master of Fine Arts, Master of Design, and Master of Arts in Art Education degrees at the graduate level.

== Library and galleries ==
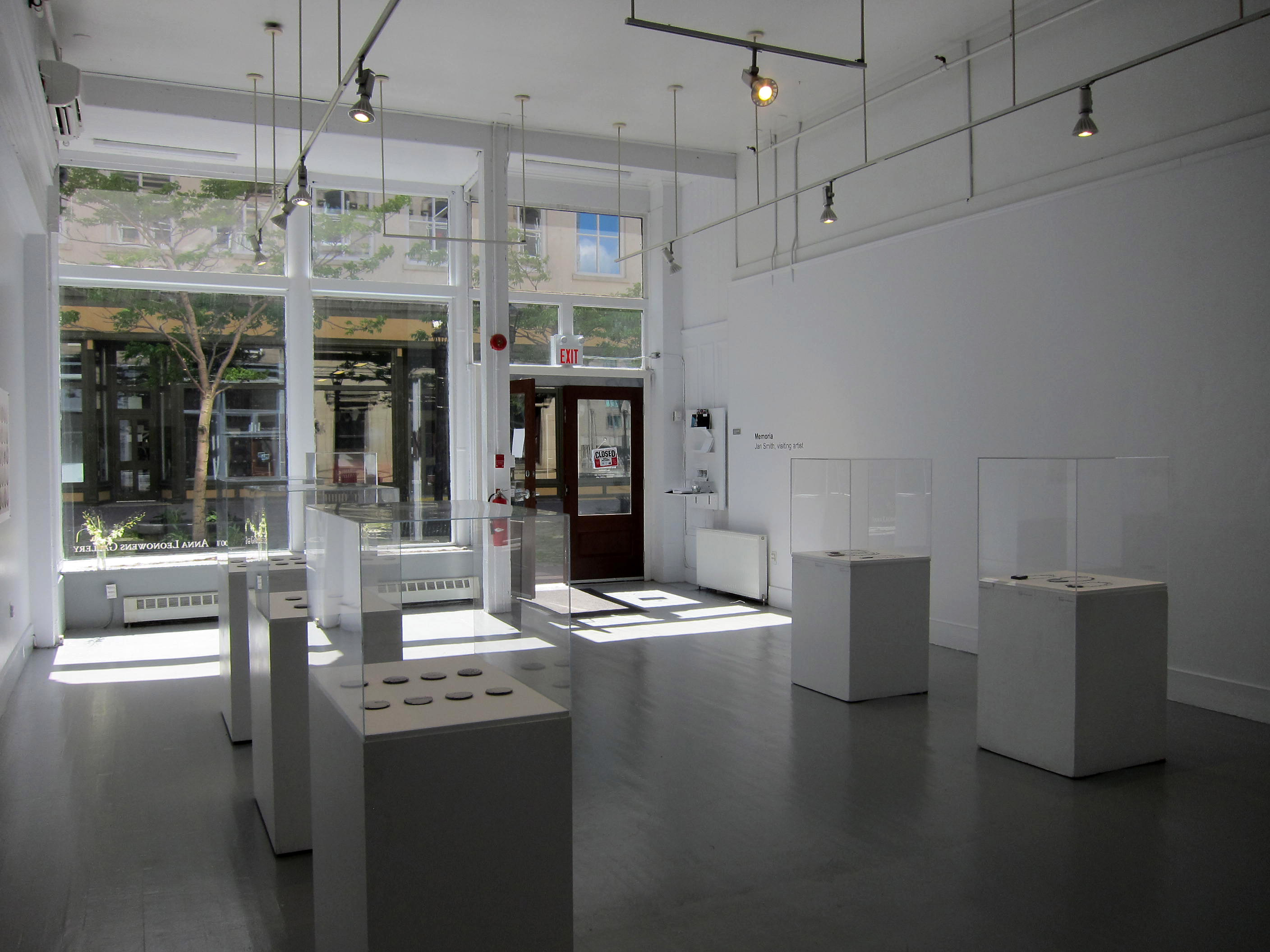
A room at the Anna Leonowens Gallery

The NSCAD University Library was founded early in the school's history and is now located in the Fountain Campus. It is the only art and design library in Atlantic Canada. Its collection includes over 50,000 books and periodicals as well as the Visual Resources Collection, which comprises 140,000 slides, 16mm films, video tapes and other multimedia materials. The library is a member of Novanet, which facilitates inter-library loans between Nova Scotian academic libraries.

Historical fine arts and ceramics; contemporary fine arts and printmaking collections are housed in the Anna Leonowens Gallery, founded in 1968. The gallery hosts exhibitions of the work of undergraduate and graduate students, faculty members, visiting artists and curators. The Port Campus hosts the Treaty Space Gallery and Port Loggia Gallery.

The university was also formerly home to the Seeds Gallery, a non-profit gallery where students and alumni could show and sell their work. This made NSCAD the only art school in Canada to offer a dedicated commercial gallery, helping students transition from academia to entrepreneurship. It was founded by SUNSCAD, the students' union, who turned over control of the gallery to the university in 2007. In 2011 the university moved the gallery from Hollis Street to a more peripheral location at the Seaport, where it had to pay rent for the first time. The new space was a 1,000 square feet (93 m^{2}) gallery in the Annex Building, directly across the street from the Port Campus.

In September 2013 the university board of governors decided to close the Seeds Gallery on 31 March 2014. The university governance stated that closure was a cost-saving measure in light of the gallery's $40,000 yearly deficit. The students' union criticized the absence of consultation surrounding the decision and blamed the gallery's financial woes on the decision to relocate it to the Seaport. It stated that the gallery had been on the path to financial sustainability while at Hollis Street.

In January 2016 the Anna Leonowens Gallery founded the Art Bar + Projects, a space for performance art.

== School of Extended Studies ==
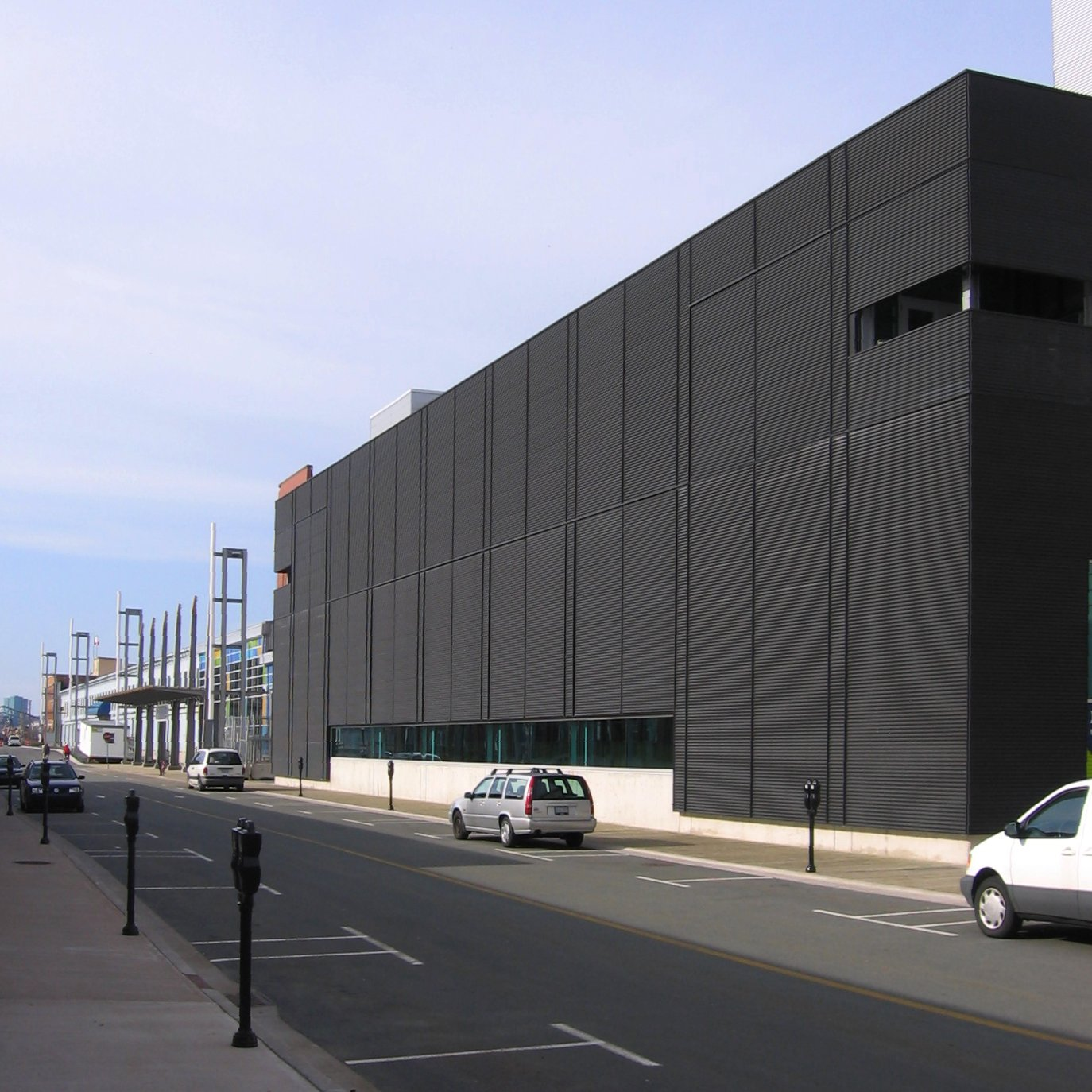
Port Campus, designed by MacKay-Lyons Sweetapple Architects of Halifax

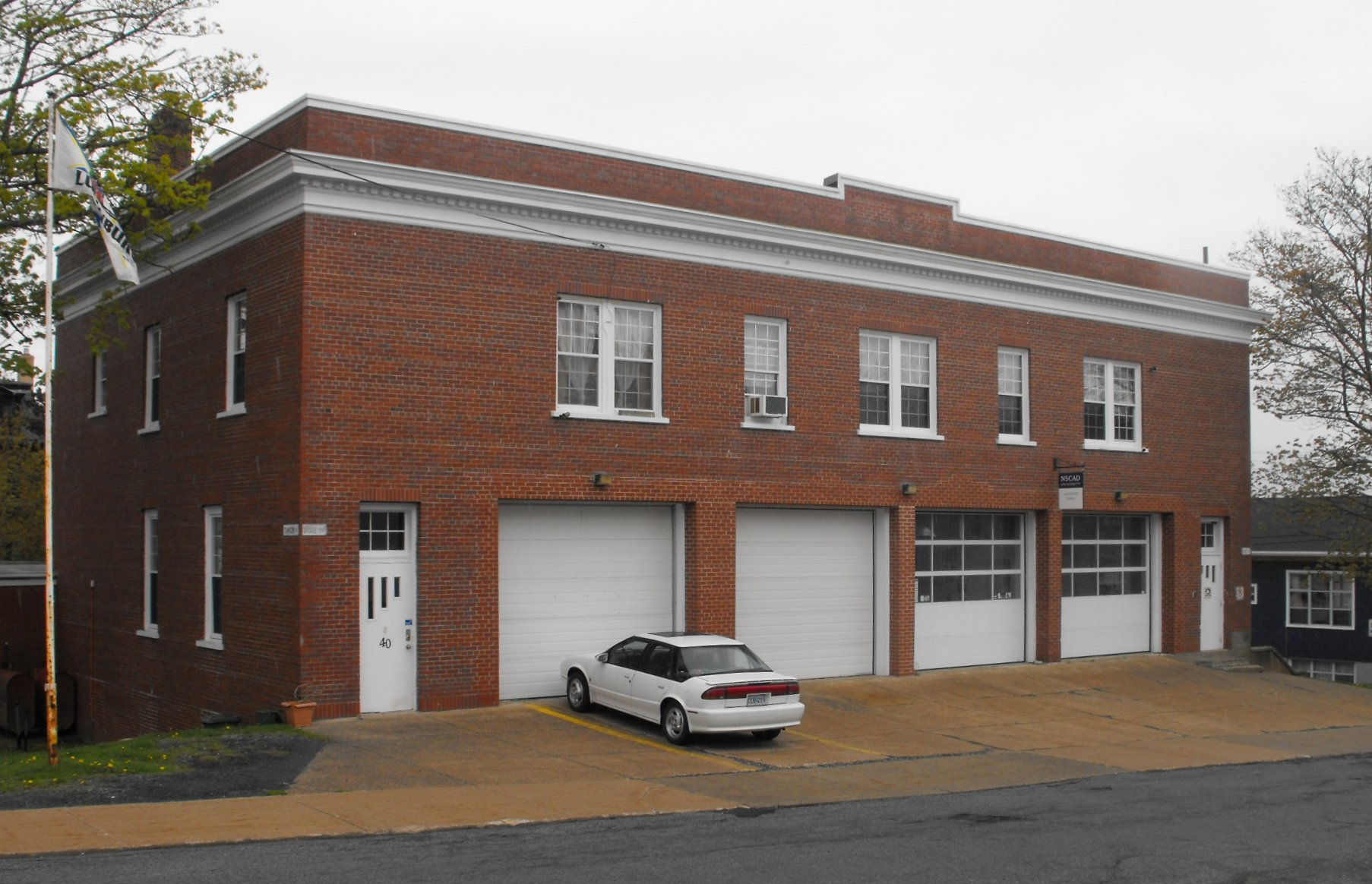
Lunenburg Community Residency building

NSCAD has a long history of offering the public the opportunity to study in a visual arts environment. The School of Extended Studies continues this tradition by offering the public a wide variety of non-credit studio and audit lecture courses in fine arts, media arts, craft and design. The School also manages the 30-credit Visual Arts Certificate for Teachers program, the 30-credit Visual Arts Certificate in Studio and the pre-university summer study credit program. Credit programs have admission requirements. Noncredit programs have no admission requirements although prerequisites must be met for some courses.

=== Adult programs ===
The adult studio-based and audit lecture courses are available to individuals who are 16 years or older. These courses are designed to meet personal and professional development interests and to prepare for studies in an undergraduate visual arts degree program. Curricula incorporate skills, processes, and health and safety issues. New approaches and ways of seeing, analyzing, experimenting and problem solving through observation are promoted. To ensure program quality, planning is ongoing with other areas of NSCAD University. New courses are added regularly to introduce different subject matter and in response to public demand.

=== Children and teen programs ===
Saturday Children's Art Classes began in 1887 and are one of the earliest known examples of such programs in North America. Children in grades 1–6 participate in a variety of fun age-appropriate activities that introduce basic visual arts skills.

Teen Art Studio courses for students in Grades 7–12 introduce fundamental visual art skills and processes, introduce NSCAD facilities and provide older teens an opportunity to build a portfolio for admission to an undergraduate visual arts degree program. Saturday youth courses for ages 5–18 are offered during the spring, fall, and winter terms, and week-long camps are offered during summer. Week-long March Break camps are offered during the provincial school break.

=== Night Shift Exhibition ===
An annual Night Shift Exhibition to display student work completed in Extended Studies course is held in the Anna Leonowens Gallery located on the NSCAD Granville campus. Family and friends are encouraged to attend this popular exhibit and enjoy a variety of different works of art created by all ages.

== University press ==
Under the direction of Kennedy, the Press of the Nova Scotia College of Art and Design was established as a vehicle to publish books by and about leading contemporary artists. The press was important in establishing the university's international reputation. Between 1972 and 1987, 26 titles by such artists as Michael Snow, Steve Reich, Gerhard Richter and Yvonne Rainer were published. The press re-launched in 2002.

== Notable people ==
=== Alumni ===
- Vikky Alexander – artist
- Jaime Angelopoulos – sculptor
- Jennifer Angus – artist
- Thomas Bezanson – potter
- Jennifer Bolande – artist
- Gerard Collins – painter
- Cliff Eyland – artist
- Paula Ann Gallant – teacher
- Audrey Dear Hesson – artist and the school's first Black graduate
- Karin Jones – artist
- Snook – comedian
- Jack Wong – writer

=== Faculty ===
- David Askevold – artist, faculty
- Bruce Barber – faculty
- Dara Birnbaum – artist, faculty
- Benjamin H. D. Buchloh – editor, art historian
- Eric Cameron
- Cassils – performance artist
- Gerald Ferguson – artist, faculty
- Michael Fernandes – artist
- Eric Fischl – painter and sculptor, faculty
- Robert Frank – photographer, faculty
- Wendy Geller – video artist
- Beck Gilmer-Osborne – transmedia artist
- April Gornik – painter
- Hedwig Gorski – performance poet and artist
- Lonnie Graham – photographer
- Jenn Grant – singer/songwriter
- Art Green
- Alice Mary Hagen – ceramic artist
- Susanna Heller – painter
- Steven Holmes – curator
- Teresa Hubbard and Alexander Birchler – artists
- Libbe Hubley – Canadian senator
- Ursula Johnson – artist, Sobey Award winner 2017
- John Kahrs – Academy Award-winning director of Paperman
- Garry Kennedy – faculty
- Arounna Khounnoraj – artist, teacher, and author
- Laura Kipnis – media critic
- Orland Larson – goldsmith, faculty, craft advocate
- Micah Lexier – artist
- Arthur Lismer – artist
- Deirdre Logue – artist
- Toshiko MacAdam – textile artist
- Rob MacInnis – artist
- Bruce MacKinnon – editorial cartoonist for The Chronicle Herald
- Kerri MacLellan – musician
- Christopher Manson – children's book author/illustrator
- Kelly Mark – sculptor, conceptualist
- Sarah McLachlan – singer/songwriter
- Sandra Meigs – artist
- Lisa Moore – writer
- Chris Murphy – musician
- Jimmy Rankin – singer/songwriter
- Julia Rivard – athlete, designer
- William James Roué – designed the Bluenose schooner
- Andrew Scott – musician
- Michael Snow – artist, filmmaker, faculty
- Peter Soucy – comedian
- Tagaq – singer/songwriter
- Monica Tap – artist, educator
- Theodore Wan – artist
- Martha Wilson – artist, faculty
- Krzysztof Wodiczko – artist, faculty
- Laurel Woodcock – artist and academic
- Heather Young – filmmaker
- Tim Zuck – artist, faculty
- Marguerite Porter Zwicker – painter and art promoter

== See also ==
- Education in Halifax, Nova Scotia
- Higher education in Nova Scotia
- List of universities in Nova Scotia
