= Stanley Royle =

English painter (1888-1961)

- Born: 1888; Stalybridge, Cheshire, England
- Died: 1961 (aged 72–73)
- Occupations: Artist, educator
- Known for: landscape paintings
- Spouse: Lily Goulding (m. 1914)

Stanley Royle RBA, RCA (1888–1961) was an English post-impressionist landscape painter and illustrator who lived for most of his life in and around Sheffield (England), and in Canada, and was inspired by views of landscape, sea and snow.

== Early life and career ==
Royle was born at Stalybridge, Cheshire and in 1904, began studying at the Sheffield Technical School of Art. In 1908, he gained a scholarship, which enabled him to continue his studies at the art school. His earliest inspiration was his tutor, Oliver Senior. Senior was Painting Master at the art school, of whom Royle had a high opinion, and who exhibited at the Royal Academy. He also was influenced by Anglo-Danish artist Sir George Clausen.

His first employment was as an illustrator and designer for local newspapers. In 1911, he began exhibiting professionally in the UK. His first major success was to have three paintings accepted by the Royal Academy Summer Exhibition in 1913.

=== The Royal Academy ===
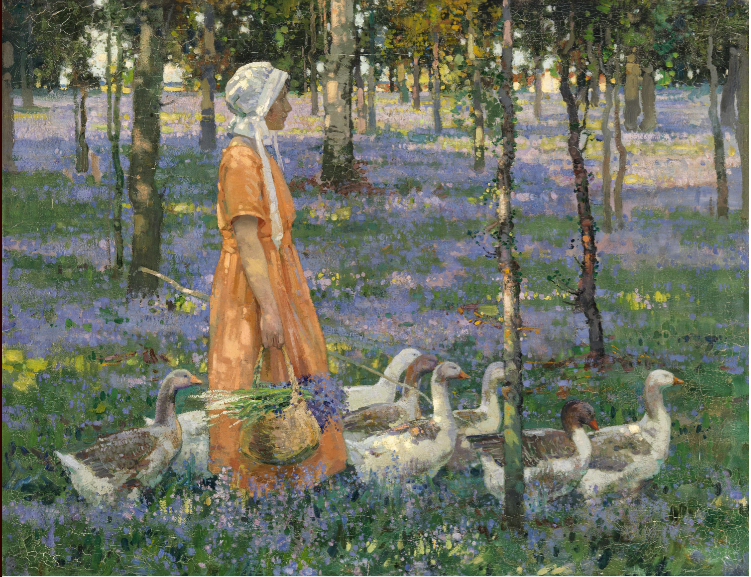
The Goose Girl, 1921

In 1913, he painted Spring Morning Amongst the Bluebells. He painted other versions of this subject, in which there is no figure, but this one, which was accepted by the Royal Academy in 1914 was and remains the main example of this genre. In 1915, his oil painting Ploughing (A Fresh Morning: View of Mosborough from Renishaw) was accepted by the Royal Academy. In 1916, Stanley Royle was successful in having two major works accepted by the Royal Academy. His election to associate member of the Royal Society of British Artists (RSBA) in 1918 indicated his increasing importance as a landscape painter. By 1920, he had been elected a full member of the RSBA and was teaching part-time at the Sheffield School of Art. One of his students was the Sheffield artist Kenneth Steel, known for his railway poster paintings.

In 1921, he painted Morning on the Derbyshire Moors. His technique is impressionistic with almost a pointillist effect combined with broad sweeps of colour. Michael Tooby has written about this painting. His article is available to read on the official Stanley Royle website:http://www.stanleyroyle.com/morning-on-the-derbyshire-moors-an-appraisal-by-mike-tooby/

Although Stanley Royle often used female figures within his compositions these were usually secondary to the landscape, which formed his chief interest. However, the three paintings Spring Morning Amongst the Bluebells, The Lilac Sun Bonnet and The Goose Girl all show single female figures prominently displayed in the foreground, while in later works figures give way in importance to the landscape.

=== The four major views of Sheffield ===
In 1922, he received a commission from Frederick Horner, a local art dealer, to paint four large views in oils of Sheffield: Sheffield from Mayfields; Sheffield from Wincobank Wood; Sheffield from the Park; Sheffield from Crookes. This quartet of paintings forms a significant part of the collection of Stanley Royle's work in Museums Sheffield. In 2005, one of this group, Sheffield from Wincobank Wood was included in the Tate Britain's exhibition A Picture of Britain.

Living in an outlying rural district with limited public transport did not prevent Stanley Royle from undertaking large canvasses of landscapes, as shown by his study Burbage Valley (Museums Sheffield). Sometimes he would walk, but often cycle, to his chosen viewpoint, with all his painting equipment and canvas strapped to the side of his bike. Whilst painting Burbage Valley he hid the canvas in a cave in order not to damage the wet paint by transporting it home. The subject of the oil painting The Goose Girl now in the National Gallery of Ireland was his wife Lily. Her health was sometimes poor, which prevented her from posing. On these occasions her younger sister Frances took her place, which is why this figure differs subtly from that of the figure in Spring Morning amongst the Bluebells. The setting is almost certainly Whitely Woods as by then the family lived close by. It was painted in the early 1920s and was exhibited in both Glasgow and Liverpool in 1924. This work had been attributed to the artist William Leech, until Jean Royle, his daughter, sold her painting Spring Morning Amongst the Bluebells in 1992. Not until then was it recognised that the same artist must have produced both paintings.

In 1925, after resigning from the RSBA, Stanley Royle was elected an associate member of The Royal West of England Academy. His success as a painter made it possible for the family to move to a newly built house at Park Head Crescent in Ecclesall and by 1930, he co-founded the Sheffield Print Club.

=== "The Depression" and Canada ===
In 1930 and 1931, Royle took a post as illustrator with the "Sheffield Independent" Newspaper. For several years he had privately taught a pupil named Elizabeth Styring Nutt who had become the Principal of the Nova Scotia College of Art, Canada. She visited Britain each summer, and eventually persuaded Royle to emigrate in December 1931, with his wife and daughter, to take up a post as a lecturer in painting there (the "Great Depression" had made it next to impossible for him to make a living in the England).

Stanley Royle taught at the Nova Scotia School of Art until 1934 when he was dismissed by Nutt who saw him as a possible artistic rival. The family returned to Britain and Sheffield in the summer of that year, but in 1935, he returned to Nova Scotia to be Director of the Owens Art Museum and College of Art, then at Mount Allison University, Sackville where he became first professor of Fine Arts for the next ten years. During his tenure at Mount Allison the university became the first in Canada to offer a Bachelor of Fine Arts (BFA) degree. Among his students was Alex Colville. The Art Gallery of Nova Scotia now has one of the largest public collections of Stanley Royle's work. In 1936, he was made an Associate Member of the Royal Canadian Academy and in 1942, given full-membership as a non-resident.

During his time in Canada, he produced studies in oils of the Rocky Mountains and seascapes and coastal scenes which, with his snow and moorland scenes in Britain, are some of his finest works. Throughout his years in Canada, he returned frequently to Europe during the long summer vacations, where he conducted painting tutorials on the Isle of Sark, and in Dorset and Derbyshire.

=== The Royal Canadian Academy of Arts ===
Snow scenes were amongst Royle's favourite subjects because of the light reflected off the snow and the subtleties of colour thus created. He considered the winter landscape to have more colour than at other times of the year.

Stanley Royle became a full member of the Royal Canadian Academy of Arts in 1942 and in 1945, he and his wife returned to the UK where he sojourned with his daughter and family in Suffolk before settling in north Nottinghamshire. Many of his paintings emphasise the sky by making use of a low horizon, so Suffolk, Nottinghamshire and Lincolnshire provided ideal subjects.

He and his wife returned to live permanently in Britain in 1945. On his return he acquired a motorbike and had removable carriers built for the pillion seat to accommodate his canvasses and paint box. Throughout the remainder of the 1940s he continued to exhibit at the Royal Academy and was elected president of the Sheffield Society of Artists in 1950. The Paris Salon awarded him the Silver Medal in 1951 and the Gold Medal in 1955. During this decade he visited Ireland, Scotland, Cornwall and again Brittany as he found the lighting effects of maritime subjects particularly inspiring. Brittany was his last overseas painting expedition. Thirty-nine of his paintings were accepted for exhibition at the Royal Academy during his lifetime.

Early in 1961, he was diagnosed with liver cancer and he died in March of that year. A memorial service was held at Worksop Priory, Nottinghamshire and his grave is in one of the town's cemeteries.

In 1962, the Graves Art Gallery, part of the Sheffield Galleries and Museums Trust, held a major retrospective exhibition of his work.

=== 'Plein-air' ===
Stanley Royle had a full and academic knowledge of every aspect of painting and an ability to capture the atmospheric quality of natural lighting on the landscape. He thought nothing of pitching his easel in the middle of a stream and standing knee deep in water, whatever the weather, if that gave him the view he wanted to capture. He did not like the harsh lighting effects of the midday sun as it flattened the subject, but preferred early morning or mid to late afternoon and evening light.

In conjunction with the 1988 centenary travelling exhibition held in Canada, Patrick Condon Laurette, the Curator of the Art Gallery of Nova Scotia, published a book in 1989 titled Stanley Royle (1888–1961). The next major publication solely dedicated to Stanley Royle's life and work was published in 2008, written by Timothy Dickson and published by Derwent-Wye Fine Art. It is an illustrated publication which also includes a full catalogue raisonné of the artists work. Further publications include Our Home and Native Land - Sheffield's Canadian Artists by Michael Tooby, published in 1991 by the Sheffield Arts Department with funding from the Arts Council. His publication explores the work and relationships of Sheffield's Canadian Artists which included Arthur Lismer and Frederick Varley as well as Stanley Royle.

In 1995, Royle's daughter Jean bequeathed her collection of Stanley Royle paintings to the Sheffield Galleries and Museums Trust in order that future generations would have the opportunity of viewing, in one venue, the artist's work. This is of particular value since so many of his paintings are privately owned: however several British Collections own his works including the galleries at Rotherham, Oldham, Derby Art Gallery and the Glasgow Museum. These can be viewed at the Art UK web site. An exhibition of his work, The Great Outdoors - Paintings by Stanley Royle was held at Graves Art Gallery in 2015. In Canada, his work is in the public collections of the National Gallery of Canada, Art Gallery of Nova Scotia and elsewhere.

== Personal life ==
Stanley Royle suffered from Bright's disease and this prevented him from joining the forces in the First World War. His daughter Jean Royle (1915-2002) was also an artist.

== The Royle Art Group ==
The Royle Art Group, based in Sheffield and founded in 1952, takes its name from the artist. The group is made up of admirers and former pupils of Stanley Royle and was originally known as the Royalist Art Group.
