= Halifax Boardwalk =

Footpath in Nova Scotia, Canada

Coordinates: 44.64577°N 63.56921°W

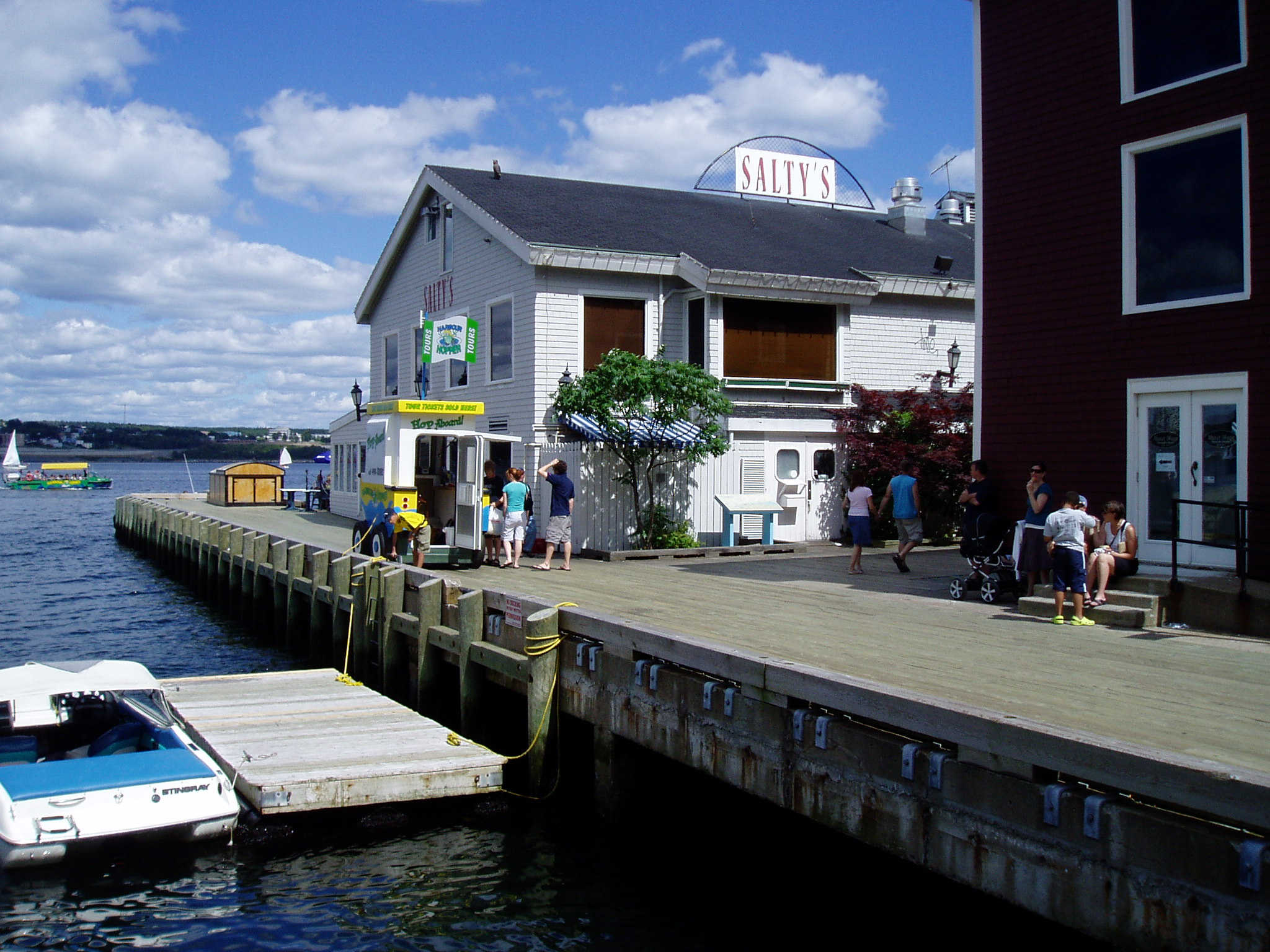
Boardwalk on Halifax waterfront

The Halifax Waterfront Boardwalk is a public footpath located on the Halifax Harbour waterfront in Halifax, Nova Scotia, Canada.

Constructed of durable heavy timber, the Halifax boardwalk is open to the public 24 hours a day. The boardwalk also includes shops at Bishop's Landing and the Historic Properties buildings as well as the "Cable Wharf", a former cable ship terminal now used as a tour boat base for several vessels formerly including Theodore Too. A fleet of tugboats operated from the tug wharves at the foot of Salter Street for over a hundred years, including the famous tug Foundation Franklin but in 2010 the last tugs such as Point Chebucto were transferred to Port Hawkesbury. The final working vessels to regularly operate from the waterfront were pilot boats which were based at a small pier at the foot of Sackville Street, but in late 2020 their base moved to a wharf in Dartmouth near the foot of the Macdonald Bridge. The former tug and pilotage wharves have since been partially demolished and refurbished to make way for new public amenities.

The boardwalk's southern terminus is at Halifax Seaport. It stretches northwards along the coast for approximately 3 km (2 mi) before it terminates in front of Casino Nova Scotia at its northern terminus. Three notable museums are located on the waterfront. The Pier 21 immigration museum is located at the southern terminus. The Maritime Museum of the Atlantic at the boardwalk's centre and includes the museum ship CSS Acadia. Just south of Acadia is the summer home of the museum ship HMCS Sackville.

The waterfront boardwalk is administered by Build Nova Scotia, a provincial crown corporation, which has an office at the Cable Wharf.

== Points of interest ==
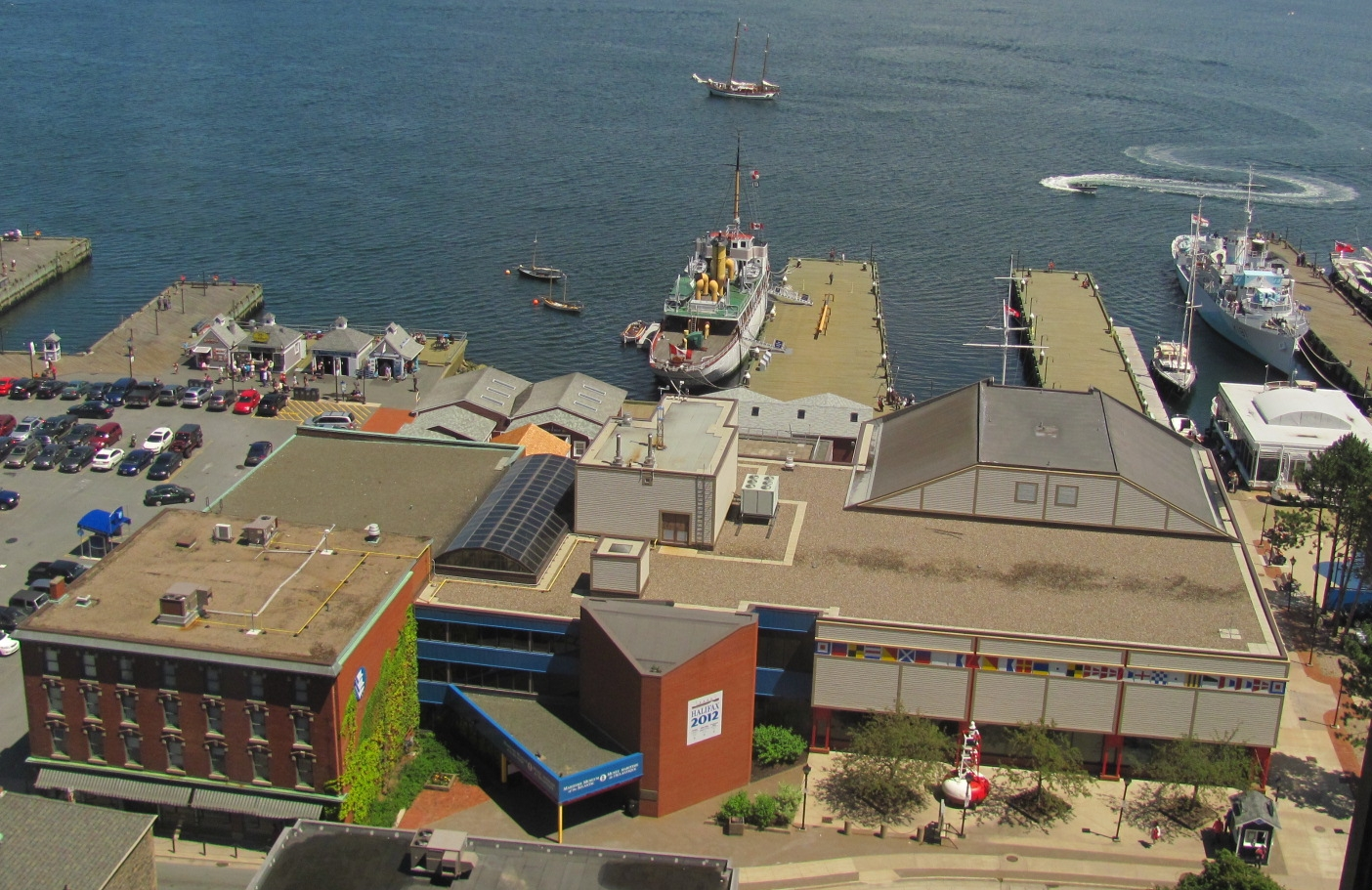
Halifax Waterfront between Prince and Sackville Streets showing the Maritime Museum of the Atlantic, CSS Acadia and HMCS Sackville

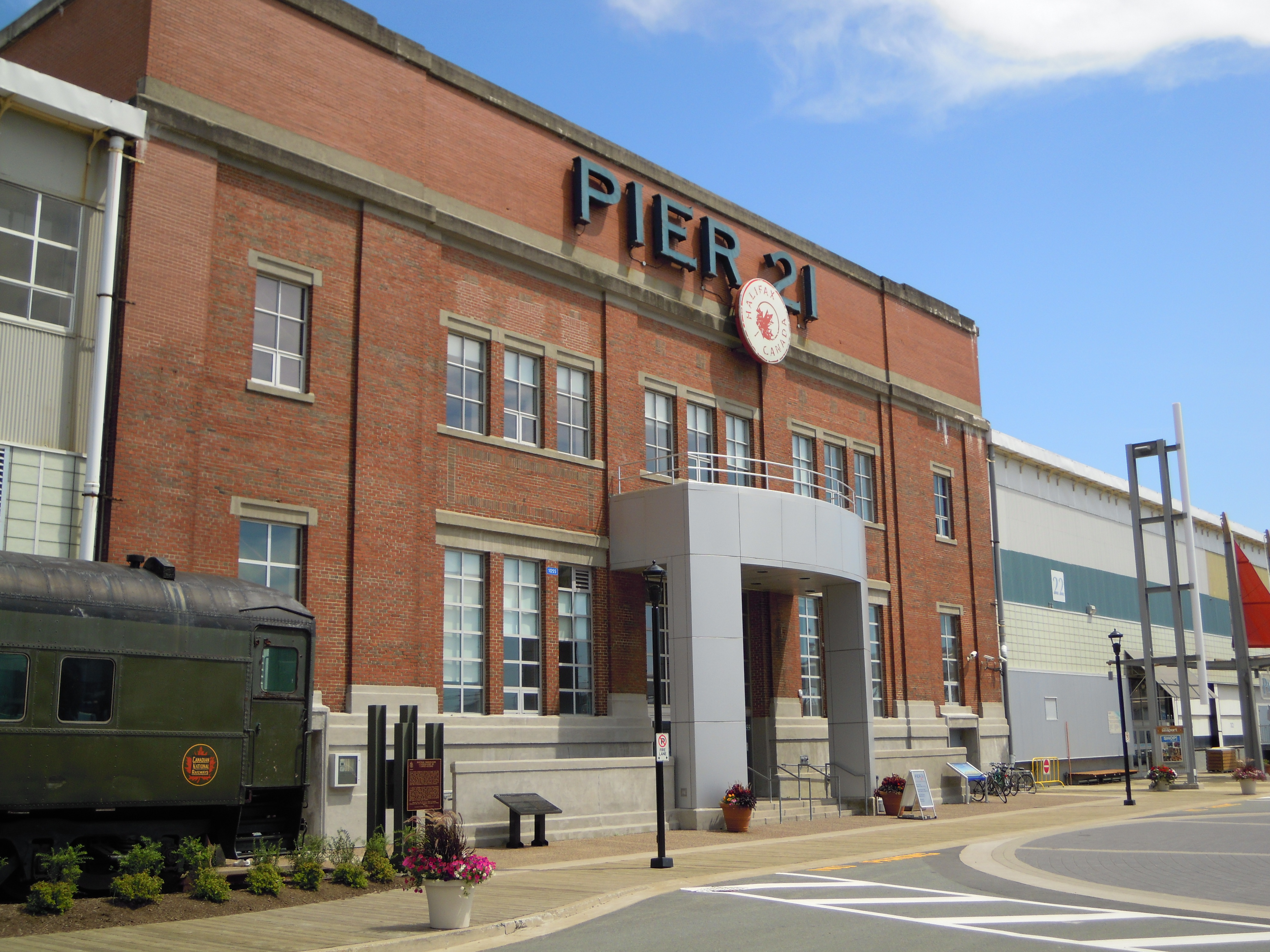
Pier 21, now home to Canada's national immigration museum

Ordered from north to south:

- Casino Nova Scotia
- Purdy's Wharf
- Marriott Harbourfront Hotel
- Historic Properties (Halifax)
- Water Street Ferry Terminal
- Murphy's on the Water and the Cable Wharf
- CSS Acadia
- Maritime Museum of the Atlantic
- Sackville Landing
- HMCS Sackville (summer months)
- Tug wharves and Foundation Franklin monument
- Bishop's Landing
- Nova Scotia Power Headquarters
- Halifax Seaport
  - Samuel Cunard Monument
  - Halifax Farmers' Market
  - NSCAD University (Port Campus)
  - Garrison Brewery
  - Cruise ship terminal
  - Pier 21 (home to the Canadian Museum of Immigration)
  - Cunard Centre (events centre)

== See also ==
- Halifax Seed Company
