= Port of Halifax =

Canadian seaport

- Interactive map of Port of Halifax
- Location within Canada

Location
- Country: Canada
- Location: Halifax, Nova Scotia
- Coordinates: 44.636°N 63.551°W
- UN/LOCODE: CAHAL

Details
- Type of Harbor: Natural
- Size of harbour: 15,000 hectares (150 km^{2})
- Land area: 1,000 hectares (10 km^{2})
- No. of berths: 34
- Draft depth: 16.8 m.
- President and CEO: Fulvio Fracassi

Statistics
- Annual cargo tonnage: 4,454,707
- Annual container volume: 546,691 twenty-foot equivalent units (TEU) (2019)
- Passenger traffic: 323,709 (2019)
- Website www.porthalifax.ca

The Port of Halifax comprises various port facilities in Halifax Harbour in Halifax, Nova Scotia, Canada. It covers 10 km^{2} (3.9 sq mi) of land, and looks after 150 km^{2} (58 sq mi) of water.

Located as North America's first inbound and last outbound gateway, the port of Halifax is an ice-free harbour with minimal tides. In addition, it is able to accommodate and service fully laden post-Panamax container ships.

Annually the port handles over 1,500 vessels, generating 15,000 jobs and $2 billion in economic impact. Halifax is considered one of Canada's top four container ports in terms of the volume of cargo handled.

== History ==
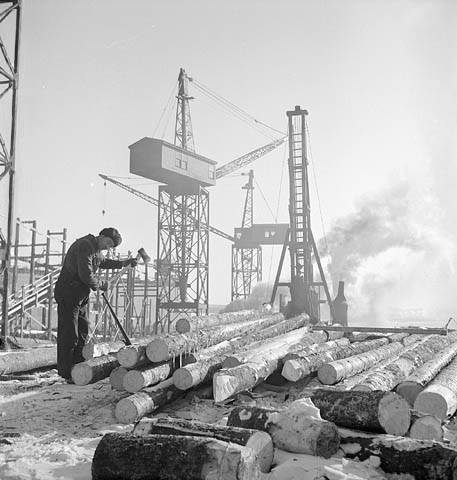
Workman prepares timbers to be used in construction at the Halifax shipyards, 1942.

After the Royal Navy withdrew from Halifax in 1905, the dockyards were handed over to the Government of Canada. Prior to World War I, the government began the Ocean Terminals project. A new railway was built through the city's South End to service the modern piers, the first of which opened in the early 1920s. Shipping grew sharply during World War II.

With the containerisation revolution of shipping, it was decided to build a container terminal in Halifax. The South End Container Terminal opened in the South End in 1969 at the site of the former Seaward Defence Base.

A specialised vehicular processing facility, the Autoport, was opened in 1971. It provides various pre-distribution services in addition to basic loading and off-loading. The number of vehicles handled annually by the Autoport has grown from 100,000 in 1979 to about 250,000 today.

By the late 1970s the South End Container Terminal was operating at capacity, handling more tonnage than any other container terminal in Canada. A second container terminal at Fairview Cove was therefore built at a cost of $47 million and opened in 1982. It was originally a single-berth facility, and operations were contracted out to Cerescorp Inc. The terminal has since been expanded. In 2003, Ceres (now a subsidiary of Nippon Yusen) successfully bid on a continued operations contract, effective January 1, 2003 for 20 years.

In 2005 the Fairview Cove Container Terminal berth depth was deepened to 16.8 metres (55 ft) (as deep as the New Panama Canal).

In 2012 a major expansion of the South End Container Terminal was completed. The depth of the berth was increased from 14.5 to 16 metres (48 to 52 ft) and the pier was extended.

In June 2017 it welcomed its first Neopanamax vessel, the ZIM Antwerp.

On August 1, 2019, PSA International completed its acquisition the former Halterm south end container terminal from Macquarie Group

In 2021, 16,020-TEU CMA CGM Explorer-class container ships made their inaugural visits to the PSA south-end terminal.

== Administration ==
Many major port facilities are owned by the Halifax Port Authority (HPA), a port authority operating as a federally regulated Crown corporation of the Government of Canada. HPA has responsibility of managing 260 acres federally owned marine industrial land in Halifax Harbour. The HPA is a member of the International Association of Ports and Harbours (IAPH).

The HPA was created on March 1, 1999 and succeeds the Halifax Port Corporation (HPC). HPC was the successor to the National Harbours Board, which operated all federally owned ports in Canada. Halifax was one of the first of eighteen national ports in Canada which implemented this administrative change as required by the Canada Marine Act which passed on June 11, 1998.

== Facilities ==
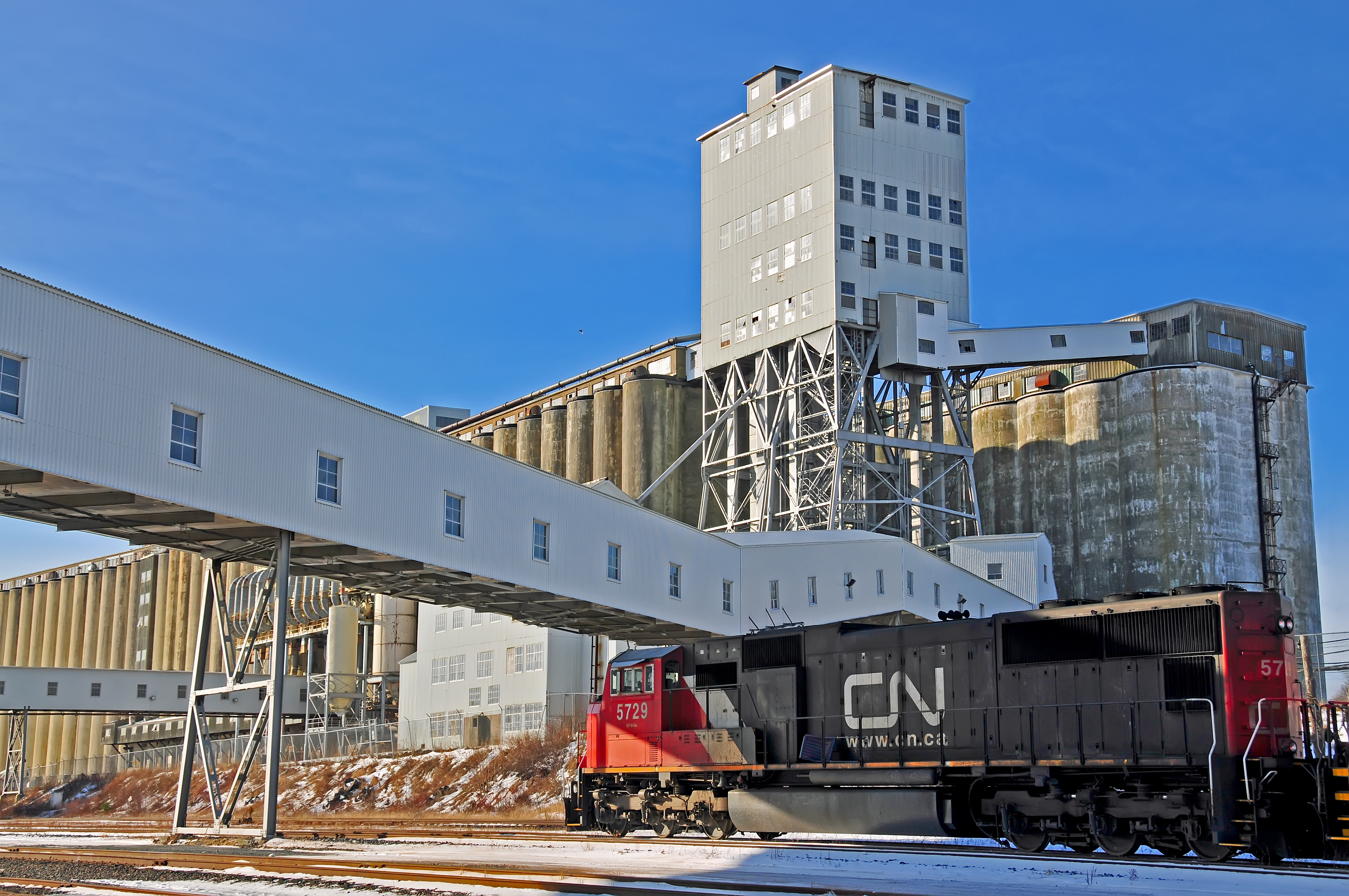
The Halifax Grain Elevator, situated west of the Ocean Terminal Yards.

Halifax Port Authority facilities include:

- South End Container Terminal – Piers 36–42 (operated by PSA Halifax)
- Ocean Terminals – Piers 23–34
- Halifax Seaport (formerly the Seawall) – Piers 20–22, Cruise Ship Pavilion and Pier 21 museum, NSCAD University, HPA administrative building
- Halifax Grain Elevator (leased and operated by Halifax Grain Elevator Limited)
- Richmond Terminals – Piers 9 and 9A
- Richmond Offshore Terminals – Piers 9B–9D (multi-user supply base for offshore oil and gas exploration/production)
- Fairview Cove Container Terminal – (currently operated by Cerescorp)
- Sheet Harbour Industrial Port

Major port facilities not owned or administered by HPA:

- National Gypsum Wharf – (owned and operated by National Gypsum Company to serve Wrights Cove gypsum terminal)
- Woodside Atlantic Wharf – (vessel lay-up and repair, servicing oil rigs)
- Imperial Oil Wharves – (Imperial Oil, serves the Dartmouth Refinery)
- Autoport – (owned by Canadian National)

All HPA facilities except the Sheet Harbour Port are serviced by Canadian National.

== Cruise ships ==
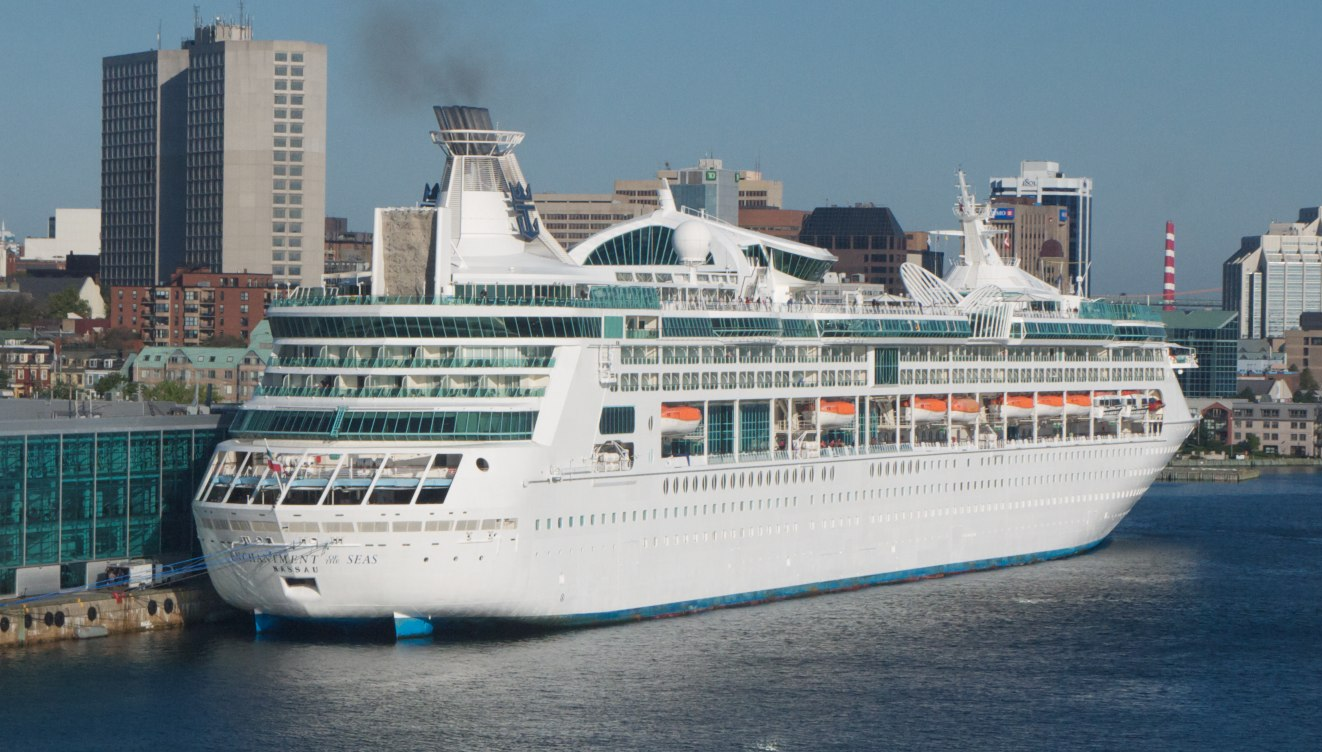
Cruise ship berthed at the Port of Halifax

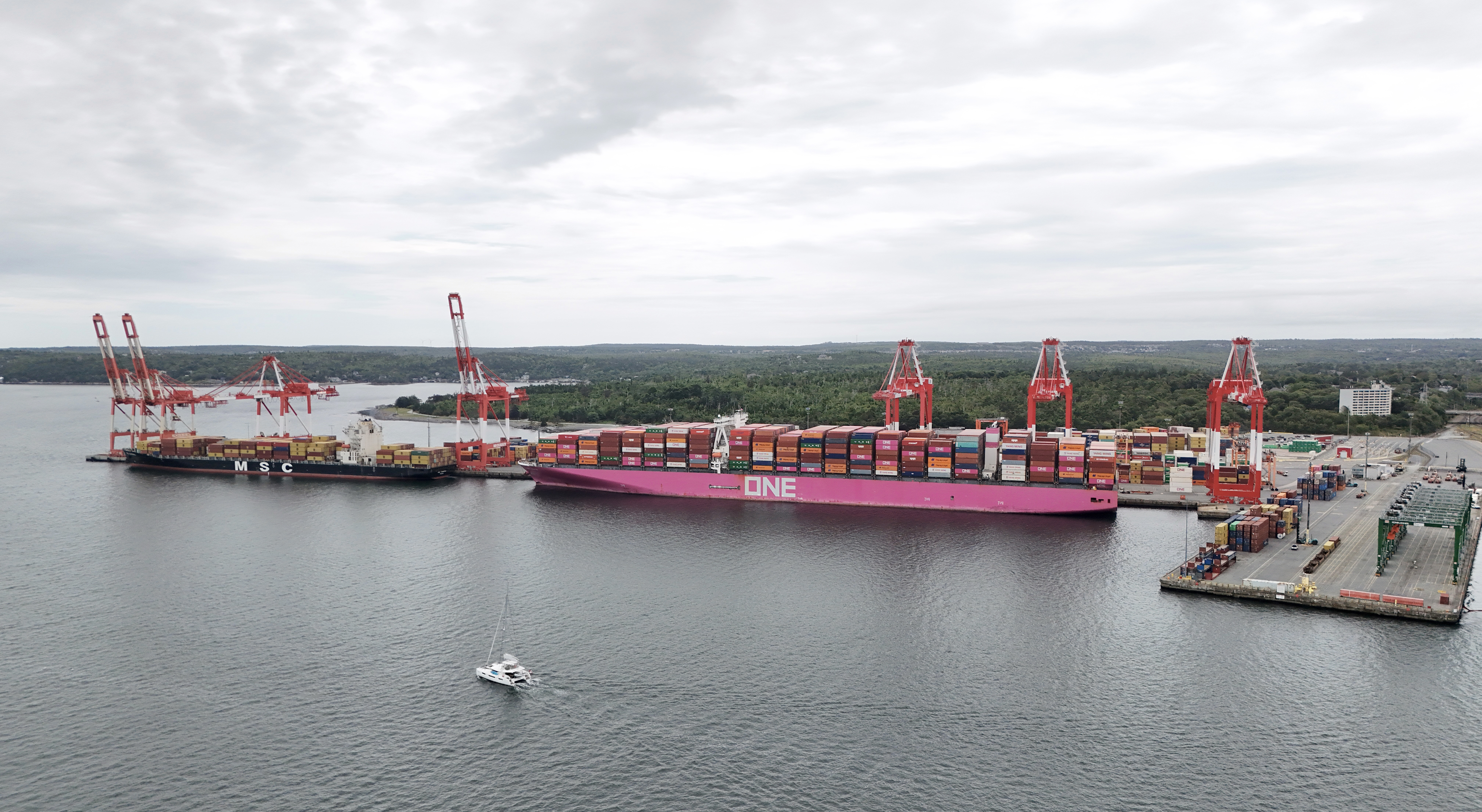
PSA Atlantic Hub at the southern side of the port

In addition to being one of the world's largest natural harbours for breakbulk, bulk, roll-on/roll-off, containerized and project cargoes, the Halifax seaport has become an increasingly popular port of call for cruise ships from around the world. In 2019, the Port of Halifax had 179 cruise vessel calls with over 323,000 passengers aboard. It is estimated that cruise passengers alone contribute about $172 million to Halifax's economy every year.

== See also ==
- CFB Halifax
- Halifax Shipyard
