= East Coast Lifestyle =

Canadian clothing company

- Industry: Clothing
- Genre: Nautical style, Lifestyle
- Founded: 2013; 13 years ago at Acadia University, Nova Scotia, Canada
- Founder: Alex MacLean
- Headquarters: Nova Scotia, Canada
- Website: eastcoastlifestyle.com

East Coast Lifestyle is a Canadian lifestyle clothing company founded by Alex MacLean in 2013. Based in Atlantic Canada, the clothing brand utilizes an anchor symbol which serves as a means of symbolization towards Atlantic Canadians.

== History ==
East Coast Lifestyle was founded by student Alex MacLean in 2013. The company was founded as an assignment in his business class at Acadia University in Wolfville, Nova Scotia. The company, which is based in and meant as a symbolization for Atlantic Canada, features an anchor symbol as its logo. The company's first physical retail location was opened in 2015 at the Seaport Market in Halifax. Within its first two years of business, the clothing line sold over 300,000 pieces of merchandise, with the brand emerging as one of the most popular among Atlantic Canadians.

In January 2021, East Coast Lifestyle entered a partnership with Stanfield's to release a new line of clothing. That same year, the company partnered with Nova Scotia-based activist group GameChangers902, releasing merchandise with the proceeds being donated towards Black Nova Scotians.
