= South Park Elementary =

South Park Elementary School may refer to:

- South Park Elementary School (Delta, British Columbia) in School District 37 Delta
- South Park Elementary School (Victoria, British Columbia) in School District 61 Greater Victoria
- South Park Elementary, the fictional elementary school in the series South Park
- South Park Elementary School, a former school in the Shawnee Mission School District, Kansas
