= Halifax Seed Company =

Canadian company

- Logo of the Halifax Seed Company
- Company type: Limited company
- Industry: Gardening
- Founded: 1866; 160 years ago in Halifax, Nova Scotia, Canada
- Area served: Atlantic Canada
- Key people: Tregunno family
- Products: Seeds, gardening and landscaping supplies
- Number of employees: 75 (2013)
- Website: www.halifaxseed.ca

The Halifax Seed Company is a Canadian company specializing in seeds and garden supplies. The company was founded in 1866 in Halifax, Nova Scotia, and is the oldest continuously operating family-owned seed company in Canada.

== History ==
Halifax Seed was founded in 1866 on the Halifax Waterfront. Following the Halifax Explosion in 1917, the company relocated to Granville Street. (Note: Halifax Seed leased the building at 166 Granville Street prior to the Halifax Explosion.) In 1919, the company was purchased from J. Frank Crowe by D. G. Stewart. In 1925, Halifax Seed was purchased by Fred Tregunno, and in 1928 the company expanded their operations with the purchase of the Colley building on Granville Street. Tregunno owned the company up until his death in 1960, leaving the company to his sons Warren and Paul Tregunno. In 1948, Halifax Seed purchased the Carter Seed Company based in Charlottetown. The company's operations in Halifax were later relocated to Kane Street after the establishment of the Historic Properties in the late 1960s.

Warren Tregunno's son Tim became owner of the company in the 1980s. Tim was diagnosed with cancer in 2005, subsequently forming an advisory board in 2010 to plan for succession. He died on 25 February 2012, at the age of 55. After he died, the company was owned by his wife Nancy and her brother Mike Barclay, who was part-owner of the company since 1983.

In 2013, CBC News reported that Halifax Seed was the subject of a diplomatic cable released by WikiLeaks in the Kissinger cables. The unclassified cable referred to Halifax Seed as a "well established, reputable firm. Should be worthwhile trading partner for U.S. companies".

Halifax Seed closed their retail store during the COVID-19 pandemic in 2020, and shifted to online sales. With decreased demand from commercial greenhouse operators, the company began selling more small greenhouse kits to homeowners.

In 2025, Halifax Seed partnered with the K.C. Irving Environmental Sciences Centre and the Harriet Irving Botanical Gardens at Acadia University to preserve two native plants: the Cutleaf Coneflower and the Joe-Pye Weed. The company offered seeds for the plants as a limited-time sale, with one dollar from each sale supporting student research at the environmental sciences centre.

Halifax Seed is operated by Emily Tregunno and her sister Alison as of 2018, making it the oldest continuously operating family-owned seed company in Canada. The company received the Family Enterprise of the Year Award from the Canadian Association of Family Enterprise.

== Products and locations ==
Halifax Seed offers seeds, gardening and landscaping materials, golf course supplies, and equipment for professional growers. The company employs 75 people as of 2013, and has two retail locations: one in Halifax, and the other in Saint John, New Brunswick.

The company opened their Saint John location in 1957. Before this, they sold their products through the National Packing Company on Union Street; after National Packing ceased operations, Halifax Seed established their presence in Saint John on Main Street. In 1982, Halifax Seed moved to a new 3,000 sq ft (280 m^{2}) wholesale and retail location on Rothesay Avenue, with the grand opening marking 25 years of the company's presence in the city.
