= Discovery Centre =

Coordinates: 44.646094°N 63.573469°W

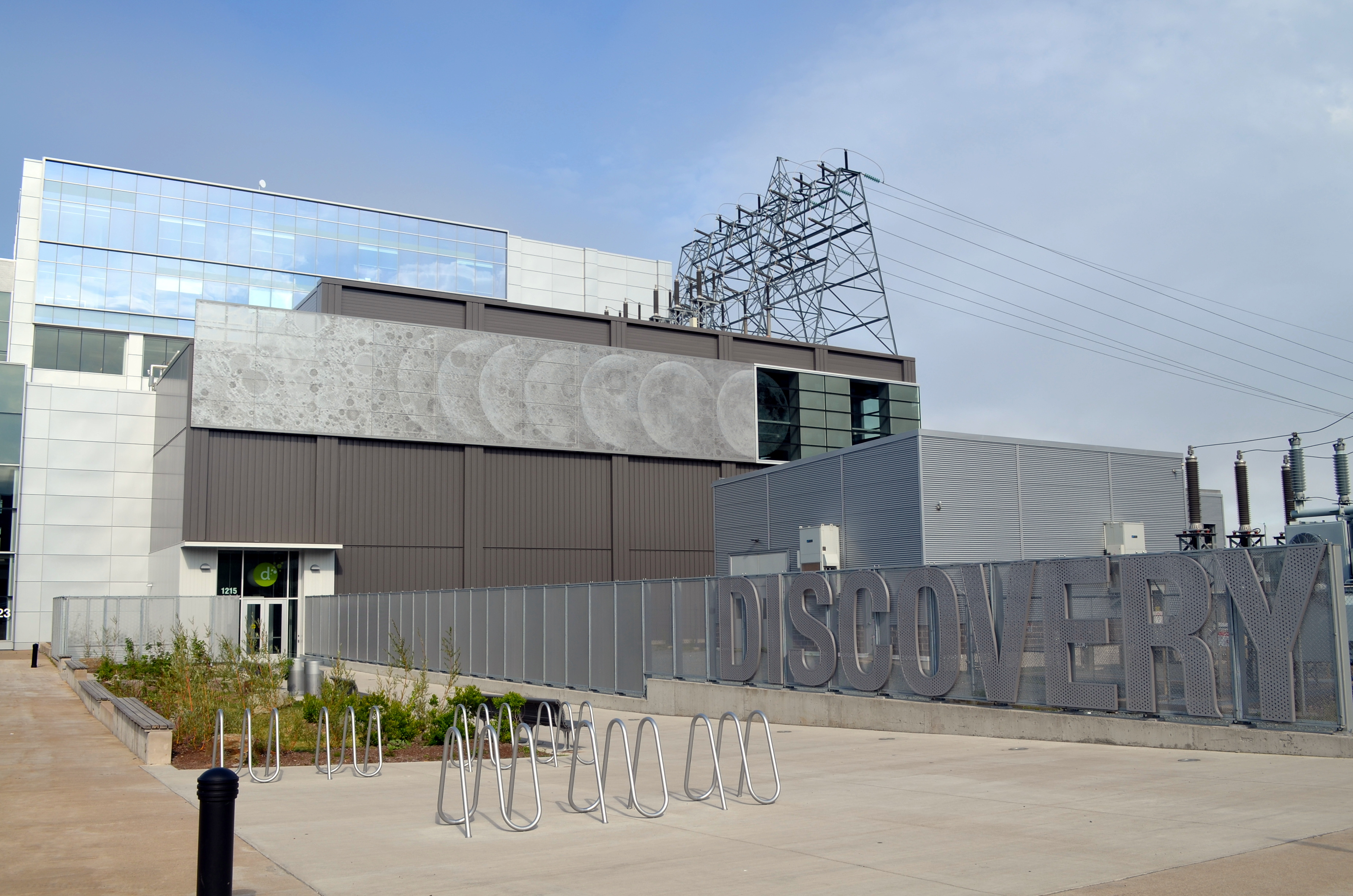
- Exterior of the Discovery Centre's new location
- Established: 1990
- Location: Halifax, Nova Scotia
- Type: Science museum
- Public transit access: Halifax Transit
- Website: thediscoverycentre.ca

Discovery Centre is an interactive science museum in Halifax, Nova Scotia. It is a not-for-profit charitable organization whose mission is to stimulate interest, enjoyment and understanding of science and technology.

== History ==
In the 1970s, Dr. Gehard Stroink, working for Dalhousie University, began creating interactive science demonstrations and exhibits, Richard Goldbloom and Liz Crocker began to assist Stroink, "with the idea of establishing a true science centre, where the wonders of STEAM could take permanent residence in the hearts and minds of Nova Scotians". At this point in time, the Discovery Centre was a travelling exhibition. It was first registered as Nonprofit organization in 1985, then as a Charitable organization in 1989. It moved into its first physical location, a 5000-foot space in Scotia Square in 1990. Five years later, it would move into 1595 Barrington Street (Zellers Building built 1939 and now The Jade) where it remained for 25 years.

In October 2010, the Discovery Centre announced that it would move from the Halifax Seaport, adjacent to the new headquarters of Nova Scotia Power. The museum closed the Barrington Street Location in July 2016. The new location opened February 12, 2017 and is double the size of the Barrington Street.

=== COVID-19 pandemic ===
The museum received a $50,000 grant in July 2021 from the Government of Canada for a project titled “Why Immunize: Encouraging Vaccine Confidence in Mi'kmaw Communities.” It was awarded through a grant program called “Encouraging Vaccine Confidence in Canada” jointly administered by the Canadian Institutes of Health Research (CIHR), Natural Sciences and Engineering Research Council (NSERC) and the Social Sciences and Humanities Research Council (SSHRC).

It received an additional $392,000 grant from the Public Health Agency of Canada's Immunization Partnership Fund to increase confidence in COVID-19 vaccines in black communities, Mi'kmaq peoples and 2S/LGBTQIA+ groups.

== Permanent Galleries ==
The Lower Water Street location has five permanent galleries: Energy, Health, Flight, Ocean, and Just for Kids!. It also has a featured gallery space, the contents of which change three times a year.

The Ocean Gallery opened in May 2018. It features a touch-tank that contains many Invertebrates and crustaceans that live locally.

The museum also has a 65-seat planetarium called the Dome Theatre. It features "Astronomy, Space Science and Life Science educational content". Additionally, the museum features an Innovation Lab, which contains a 3D printer, and allows guests to learn about coding, among other topics. It also features a "Bubble Room", a "perennial favourite" exhibit that originated in the Barrington Street location.

== Featured Galleries ==
Featured Galleries are temporary exhibitions.

Indigenous Ingenuity: Pjilaʼsi, welcome: An exhibition focused on traditional knowledge and inventions by First Nations.

== Affiliations ==
The museum is affiliated with the Canadian Museums Association, Canadian Association of Science Centres, Association of Science and Technology Centres, and the Virtual Museum of Canada.

The Discovery Centre is also Rainbow Registered.
