= Harriet Irving Botanical Gardens =

Botanical garden in Wolfville, Nova Scotia, Canada

Coordinates: 45°05′12″N 64°22′05″W

The Harriet Irving Botanical Gardens (HIBG) is a botanical garden located in Wolfville, Nova Scotia, Canada, on the campus of Acadia University. The HIBG is considered a tourist destination in the Annapolis Valley. Within the HIBG are nine native habitats of the Acadian Forest Region, a Medicinal and Food Garden, Conservatory, Formal Walled Garden, and Experimental Garden. The HIBG also serves as a trailhead for 1.5 km of woodland trails.

The Harriet Irving Botanical Garden is connected to the K.C. Irving Environmental Centre (KCIC), with laboratories, greenhouses, and controlled environmental facilities. The HIBG and KCIC run educational and recreational programs for the public. The staff of the HIBG act as coordinators for PlantWatch, a national program tracking climate change and other ecological activities by its volunteers.

== History ==
On September 14, 2002, the Irving family gave the Harriet Irving Botanical Gardens and K.C. Irving Environmental Centre to Acadia University, and the K.C. Irving Environmental Trust opened the gardens to the public free of charge. This funding is made possible by the K.C. Irving Environmental Trust as well as donors.

The HIBG is named after Kenneth Colin Irving's wife, Harriet Irving. Architect Alex Novell designed the gardens, and construction began in the fall of 1999. The emblem of the gardens features a mayflower, a honey bee representing hard work, and the Scotch thistle symbolizing Scotland from where the Irving family originated, as well as the country Nova Scotia is named after.

In 2025, the gardens partnered with the Halifax Seed Company to preserve two native plants: the Cutleaf Coneflower and the Joe-Pye Weed. Halifax Seed offered seeds for the plants as a limited-time sale, with one dollar from each sale supporting student research at the K.C. Irving Environmental Sciences Centre.

== Attractions ==
The Harriet Irving Botanical Gardens consist of six acres divided into nine habitats in the Acadian Forest Region. The native plants are labelled with their botanical name and common name. The HIBG has three living specimens of endangered species that are protected under the Nova Scotia Endangered Species Act. The pink coreopsis (Coreopsis rosea), water-pennywort (Hydrocotyle umbellata), and thread-leaved sundew (Drosera filiformis) are each on display at the gardens. As visitors travel through the gardens, they pass through the Walled Garden, Experimental Garden, Medicinal Garden, Deciduous Woodland, Freshwater Inland Marsh, Bog, Coastal Headlands, Mixed Woodlands, Calcareous Woodlands, Wet Woodlands, Sand Barrens, Coniferous Woodland, and finish in the Conservatory, which leads to the KCIC. An article in the local paper, The Grapevine, gives descriptions of the events.

At the entrance of the gardens, tall iron gates lead into the Walled Garden. The plants are pruned to conform to the symmetrical aspects of the traditional English garden style. Ten-foot brick walls surround the garden on the west and south sides, creating a microclimate that provides an early spring. This garden has a picturesque landscape of the Acadian Forest Region.

Medicinal Garden is the only area of the garden that displays non-indigenous species in the Acadian Forest Region. However, many of these plants escaped from early homesteads. A white cedar hedge surrounds the garden, and two rows of linden trees create a pleached hedge along the pathway. Interpretive signs are displayed throughout the garden, explaining the early uses of the medicinal and food plants displayed.

An artificial bog has been created to demonstrate a mossy, peat-covered wetland. Pitcher plants can be witnessed growing in this area of the HIBG.

== K.C Irving Environmental Centre ==
The centre provides a space to conduct studies in ecology and conservation. In the basement of the centre, the E.C Smith Herbarium can be found.
