= Halifax Grain Elevator =

Grain elevator in Nova Scotia, Canada

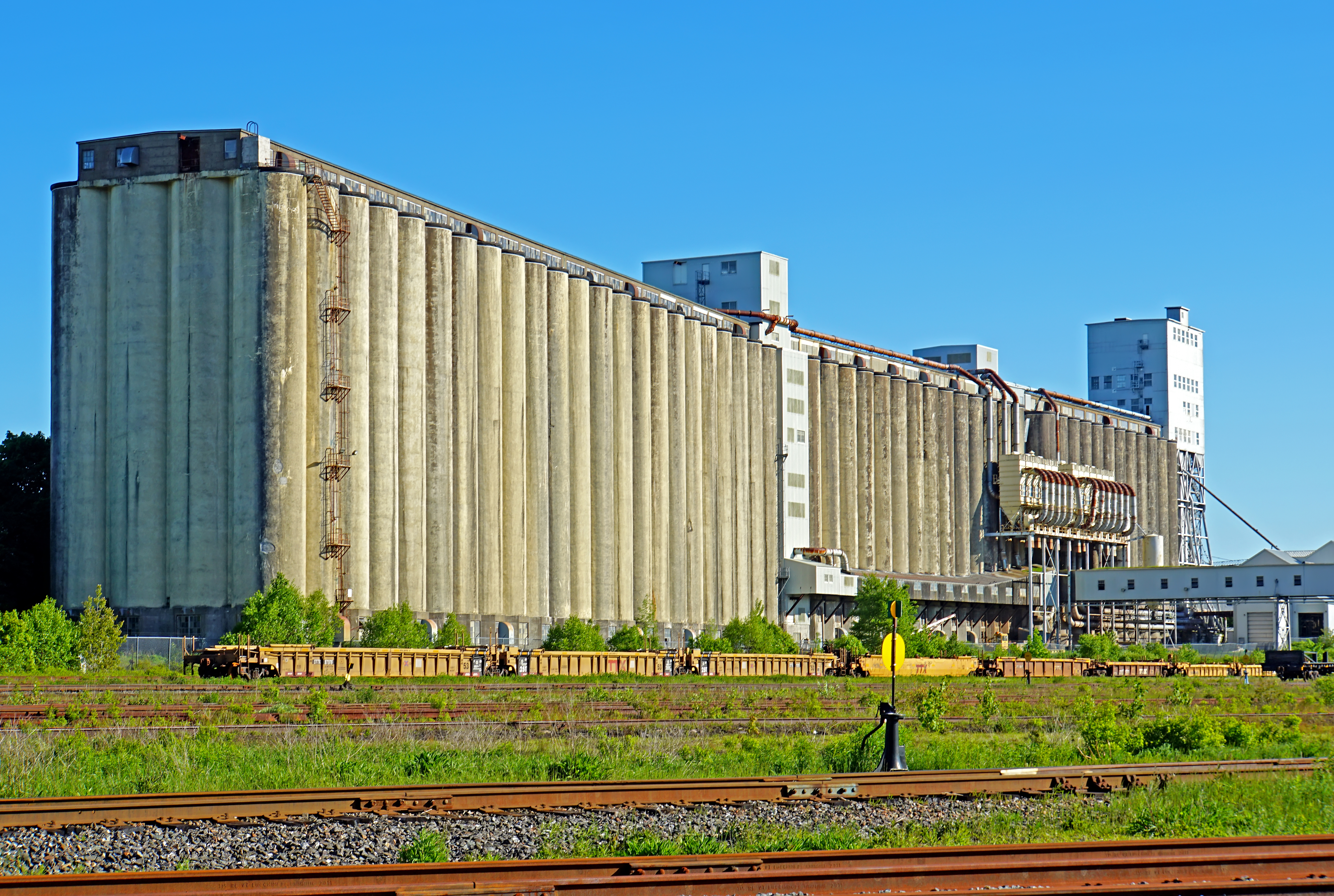
- Halifax Grain Elevator in 2016
- Interactive map of the Halifax Grain Elevator area

General information
- Type: Grain elevator
- Location: 951 South Bland Street, Halifax, Nova Scotia, Canada
- Coordinates: 44.6343028°N 63.5706093°W
- Opened: 1925

The Halifax Grain Elevator is an industrial facility located at the Port of Halifax in the Canadian province of Nova Scotia. Operating since 1925, the elevator stores and exports commodities such as grains, soybeans, and wood pellets. The elevator is operated by Halifax Grain Elevator Limited, which has a lease on the facility due to expire at the end of 2026. The 50-year development plan released by the Port of Halifax in 2022 includes infilling the berth used by the grain elevator, a decision that would affect its ability to export.

== History ==
=== Early elevators ===
The first grain elevator in Halifax was completed in 1883, and later destroyed by fire. A new elevator opened on 31 October 1899 on Water Street to replace it.

=== Current elevator ===
The Halifax Grain Elevator has been operating since December 1925. (Note: Some sources say the elevator has been in operation since 1924.) The facility was expanded in 1929, the 1950s, and the 1960s. Owned by the Port of Halifax and operated by Halifax Grain Elevator Limited, it has a total of 365 silos for storing commodities, each one capable of holding up to 140,000 tonnes of grain. The facility also stores and transfers wood pellets and soybeans, and is connected to the nearby flour mill.

In August 2003, a large explosion at the grain elevator and subsequent fire forced the evacuation of 400 people from their homes nearby.

In 2022, the Port of Halifax released their 50-year development plan, which included infilling the berth used by the grain elevator to load ships for export. The general manager of Halifax Grain Elevator Limited stated that without the ability to export, the grain elevator would no longer be financially viable. The plan raised concerns amongst farmers, with one soybean farmer claiming the loss of the grain elevator would force his business to close down. The Port of Halifax said in a statement that no decisions have yet been made, and that the port "supports ongoing operations at the grain elevator and continued port expansion plans". Halifax Grain Elevator Limited has a lease on the elevator which is due to expire at the end of 2026.

There are residential and commercial buildings adjacent to the grain elevator. A 2023 report prepared for the Halifax Regional Municipality stated that the nearby Grainery Lofts apartments, some houses on Blue Willow Court, and an Atlantic Street commercial building are at least partially within 25 metres (82 feet) of the grain elevator, defined as the restricted zone. The report noted that buildings within 100 metres (330 feet) of the elevator faced a risk of major property damage if an explosion occurred at the elevator.

== See also ==
- Agriculture in Nova Scotia
- List of grain elevators
- Pier 21 – nearby terminal
