= James Bay, Greater Victoria =

Neighbourhood of Victoria, British Columbia

Coordinates: 48.419°N 123.382°W

- Neighbourhood of Victoria
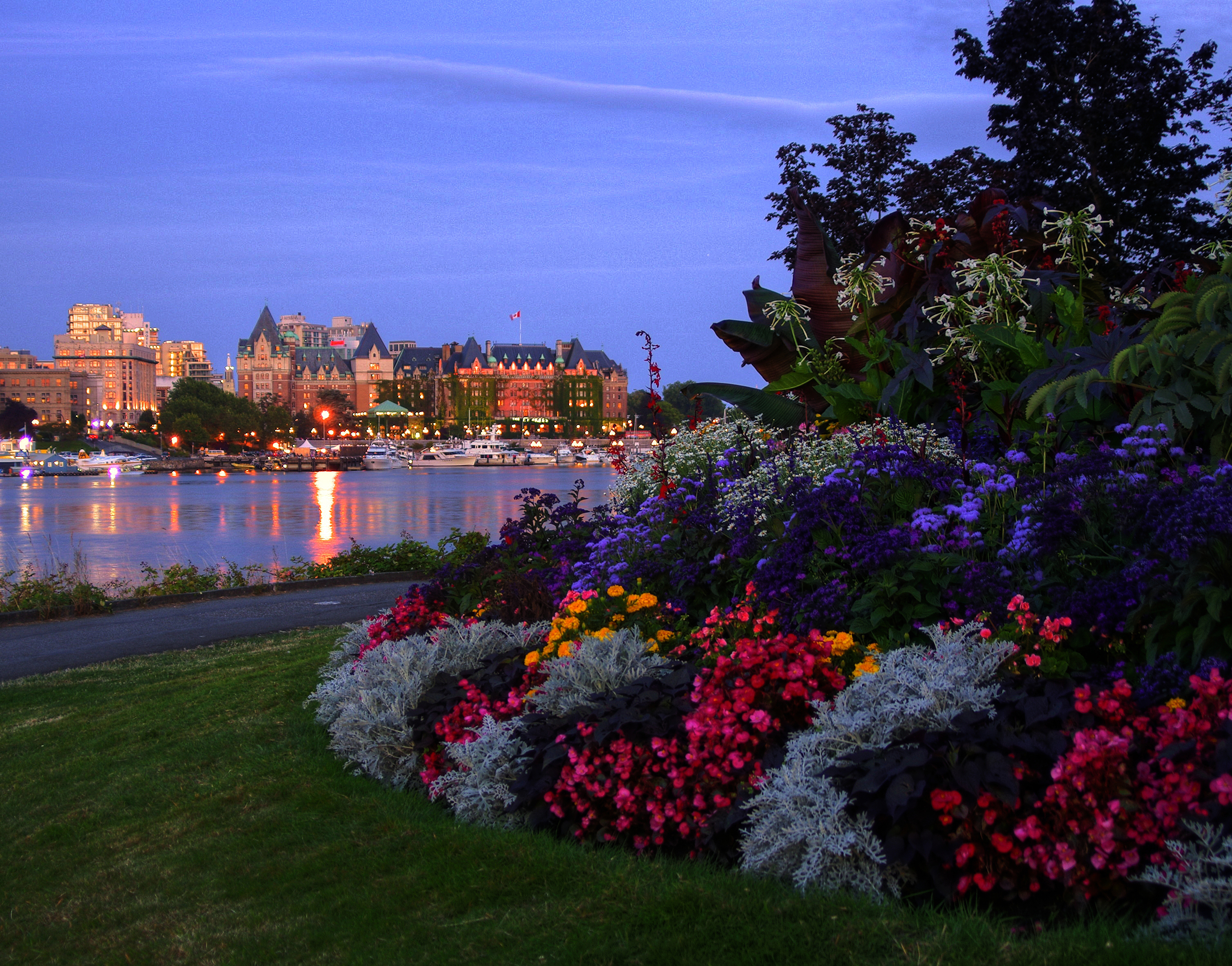
- Laurel Point
- Etymology: Sir James Douglas
- Interactive map of James Bay, Greater Victoria
- Country: Canada
- Province: British Columbia
- Regional district: Capital
- City: Victoria

Government
  - Type: Board
  - President: Trevor Moat
  - Vice president: Linda Carlson
  - Secretary: Bob Vander Steen
  - Directors at Large: Keira Jackson; Kirk Buhne; Dave Klassen

Population (2021)
  - Total: 12,771
- Time zone: UTC−08:00 (PST)
  - Summer (DST): UTC−07:00 (PDT)
- Forward sortation area: V8V
- Area code: 250
- Website: jbna.org

James Bay is a high density neighbourhood of Victoria, British Columbia, Canada. It is the oldest residential neighbourhood on the west coast of North America that is north of San Francisco. It occupies the south side of the Inner Harbour close to downtown. Access to the neighbourhood is along Belleville Street, Government Street, Douglas Street and Dallas Road.

== History ==
The original inhabitants of James Bay were the Swenghwung people who were part of the Lekwungen people of the Coast Salish and whose descendants today are known as the Songhees First Nation. Even after the Indigenous inhabitants allegedly sold the land to the Hudson's Bay Company, remains of fortifications at Holland Point and of burial grounds at Laurel Point remained. The neighbourhood takes its name from the shallow inlet James Bay that forms part of Victoria's Inner Harbour, named for James Douglas. Settled early after the establishment of Fort Victoria in 1843, much of the present day neighbourhood was originally part of Ogden's Fields Farms, subsequently known as Dutnall's Farm and then Beckley Farm.

Residential development of James Bay began in 1859 when Governor Douglas decided to construct the colonial administration offices for the Colony of Vancouver Island across the harbour from Fort Victoria. Known as the Birdcages because of their somewhat fanciful design, the Birdcages were replaced in 1898 by Francis Mawson Rattenbury's Parliament Buildings, which still serve as the meeting place of the Legislative Assembly of British Columbia.

Between the construction of the Birdcages in 1859 and the completion of the Parliament Buildings in 1897, a considerable amount of residential development took place in James Bay. The family home of James and Amelia Douglas stood on the location of the present Royal British Columbia Museum, behind which is located the house of John Sebastian Helmcken, the colony's first doctor, speaker of the Assembly, and son-in-law of the governor. The Victorian Italianate childhood home of Canadian artist Emily Carr, built in 1863, stands on Government Street, formerly known as Carr Street, in an area of numerous mainly modest wooden homes that date to the later decades of the nineteenth century. Grander homes in James Bay include the Pendray residence on Belleville Street, built in the Queen Anne style in 1897 for William and Amelia Pendray who originally made a fortune in the Cariboo Gold Rush and later opened a soap factory at Laurel Point. and Pinehurst, another Queen Anne style residence built in 1890 on Battery Street for William James MacAulay, a retired American lumber baron and banker. The architect of Pinehurst and of many other residences in James Bay was Thomas Hooper, whose own modest residence stands at 243 Kingston Street. One of the largest estates in James Bay was Armadale built in 1877 for William Macdonald on 28 acres (110,000 m^{2}). After its demolition in 1944, part of the grounds became Macdonald Park.

Around 1883 commercial wharves emerged at both at Ogden Point and at Shoal Point. The latter was a rocky outcrop and shallow rocks prevent ships from approaching. The wharves disappeared and in 1975 the Canadian Coast Guard built their current base.

In addition to government offices, the James Bay area was also home to a number of industries, including Sehl's furniture factory at Laurel Point, Pendray's Soap Factory, and later Bapco Paint. Marine-oriented industries have included Laing's shipyard (where Fisherman's Wharf is located today) in the 1860s as well as a shipping terminal, flour mill, chemical plant and warehouses along the water between Laurel Point and Ogden Point. At the Inner Harbour the Canadian Pacific Railway had a steamship terminal, designed by Rattenbury and Percy James, built in 1924 in a Greek temple style and occupied since 1969 by the Royal London Wax Museum.

The Canadian Government maintained immigration facilities in the late nineteenth century, replaced with the Dominion Immigration Building, a brick building at Dallas Road and Ontario Street, in 1908. This building has been demolished.

A stone causeway across the tidal flats of James Bay was constructed starting summer 1901, replacing the wooden bridge and allowing the enclosed area to be filled. Although initially a transportation and sanitation project, starting in 1903 the Canadian Pacific Railway negotiated acquisition of the reclaimed land and adjoining properties, ultimately leading to Empress Hotel opening in 1908.

The construction of South Park Elementary School in 1914 largely marked the close of the building boom in James Bay until the 1960s, when demolition of many of the older buildings made room for the construction of a number of apartment blocks, some, like Orchard House on Michigan Street as high as twenty stories. The threatened destruction of further older homes gave rise to a grassroots heritage preservation effort.

== James Bay today ==
Fisherman's Wharf, in James Bay, Victoria BC

Fisherman's Wharf remains an active marina, and the outer harbour today is further ringed by a heliport, the Canadian Coast Guard Base at Shoal Point and a cruise ship terminal at Ogden Point. A commercial area, named “James Bay Village”, is centred on the intersection of Menzies and Simcoe Streets. The Inner Harbour area continues to be dominated by the BC Parliament Buildings and ancillary government offices along Superior Street. It is also the hub of Victoria's tourist industry with the Royal British Columbia Museum and the adjacent Empress Hotel serving as focal points for visitors to the city.

== Climate ==
Victoria has a Mediterranean climate (Csb), with mild rainy winters and cool dry summers.

The weather in the City of Victoria may vary greatly from neighbourhood to neighbourhood. For instance, James Bay which is surrounded on three sides by the ocean, is typically 3 to 5 degrees Celsius (5 to 10 °F) cooler in summer than more inland areas of Victoria. In winter, James Bay is typically a few degrees warmer than other parts of Victoria. It therefore receives significantly less snow than other parts of Greater Victoria. Current weather temperatures are reported by the University of Victoria School-based weather station located at James Bay elementary school on Oswego Street.

== Places of interest ==
Capital Park in James Bay, Victoria

=== Parks ===
City parks in the James Bay neighbourhood include:

- Beacon Hill Park
- Fisherman's Wharf Park including Fisherman's Wharf (fishing vessels, fresh fish, fish and chips, etc.)
- Holland Point Park, ocean side of Dallas Road below the foot of Government St. (between Lewis St. and Paddon Ave.)
- Irving Park
- Laurel Point Park
- MacDonald Park
- South Park

=== Historic buildings and attractions ===
The James Bay neighbourhood has many historical landmarks and a number of tourist attractions:

- British Columbia Parliament Buildings, Belleville St. between Government St. and Menzies St.
- Emily Carr House
- Helmcken House, pioneer doctor's residence, 638 Elliott St. (immediately east of the Royal British Columbia Museum)
- Mile '0' of the Trans-Canada Highway, Douglas Street at Dallas Road
- Orchard House (Michigan Street), currently the tallest building in Greater Victoria
- Ogden Point: cruise ship terminal and HeliJet terminal
- Royal British Columbia Museum, Belleville St. between Government St. and Douglas St. (just east of the British Columbia Parliament Buildings)
- Site of the former Immigration Building
- Inner Harbour Ferry Terminal for MV Coho and Victoria Clipper US-bound ferries

=== Other points of land ===
- Clover Point, processed waste water and storm water outfall ocean side of Dallas Road between Moss St. and Bushby St.
- Finlayson Point, ocean side of Dallas Road due south of Beacon Hill Park lookout
- Horseshoe Bay, a small sandy cove immediately to the west of Finlayson Point
- Victoria Point, a small point of land ocean side of Dallas Road below the foot of Douglas St.
