= Agriculture in Nova Scotia =

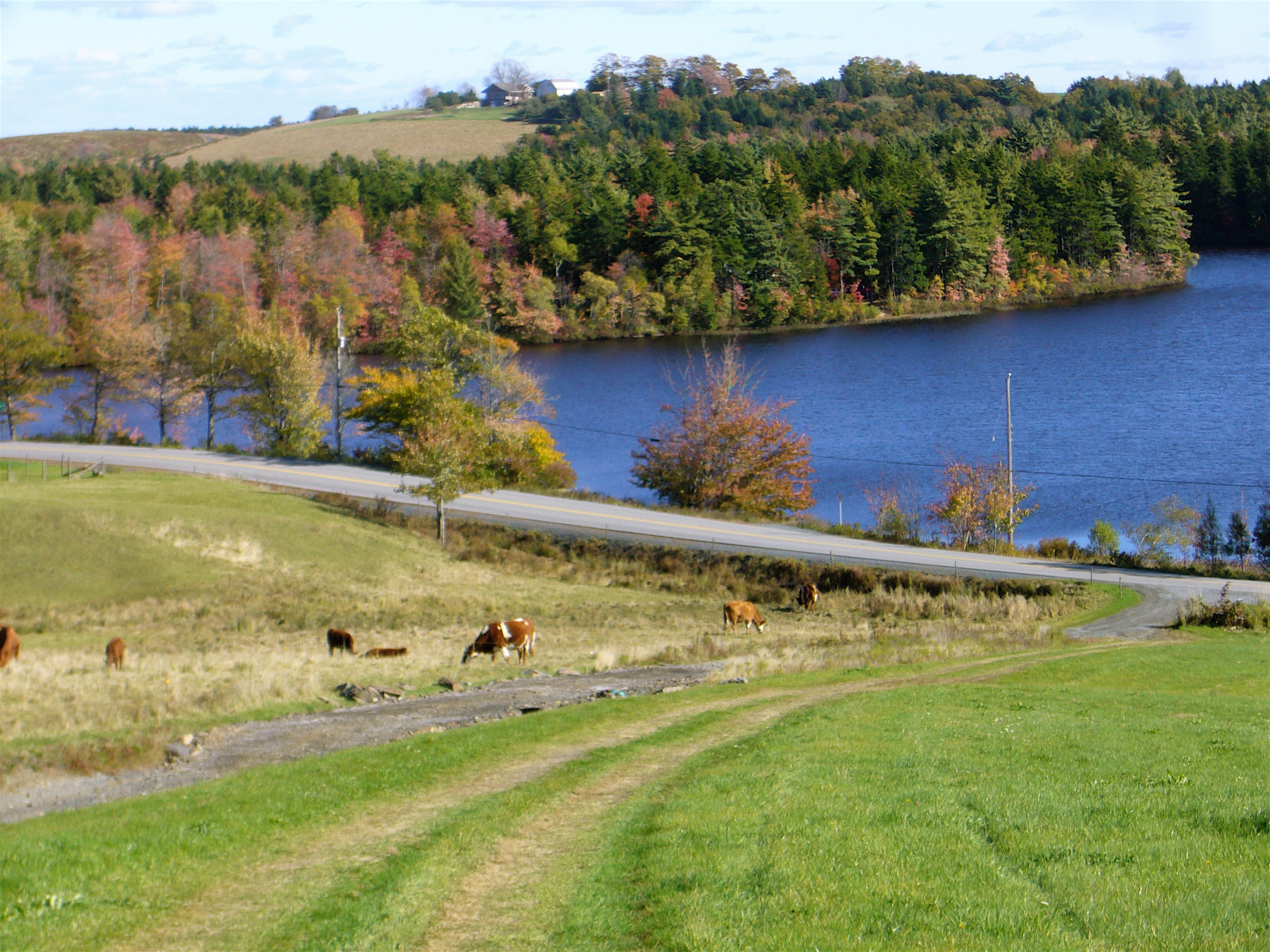
Cattle grazing in Waterloo

Agriculture in Nova Scotia is the production of various food, feed, and fiber commodities to fulfill domestic and international human and animal sustenance needs. Nova Scotia is a province in Atlantic Canada, totaling 55 284 km^{2} of land and water, and bordering New Brunswick. This province has about 3,795 farms averaging 262 acres per farm. The total land area used for farm lands in Nova Scotia is 995,943 acres.

There is a large range of crops and animals raised in the province and it is a large part of the economy in Nova Scotia. The Department of Agriculture is responsible for the overview of the agricultural practices in Nova Scotia.

== History ==
The name Nova Scotia originates from the Latin for "New Scotland"; this does not reflect the history of the early settlers as they left and went back to Scotland under a treaty with the French. French had settled before the Scottish and remained afterwards for 150 years. The French were critical to the farming of Nova Scotia as they built Dykes that increased the acreage able to be farmed by 20,000 to 30,000 hectacres. Historically much of Nova Scotia was covered with forest; much of this has been reduced by the actions of the settlers.

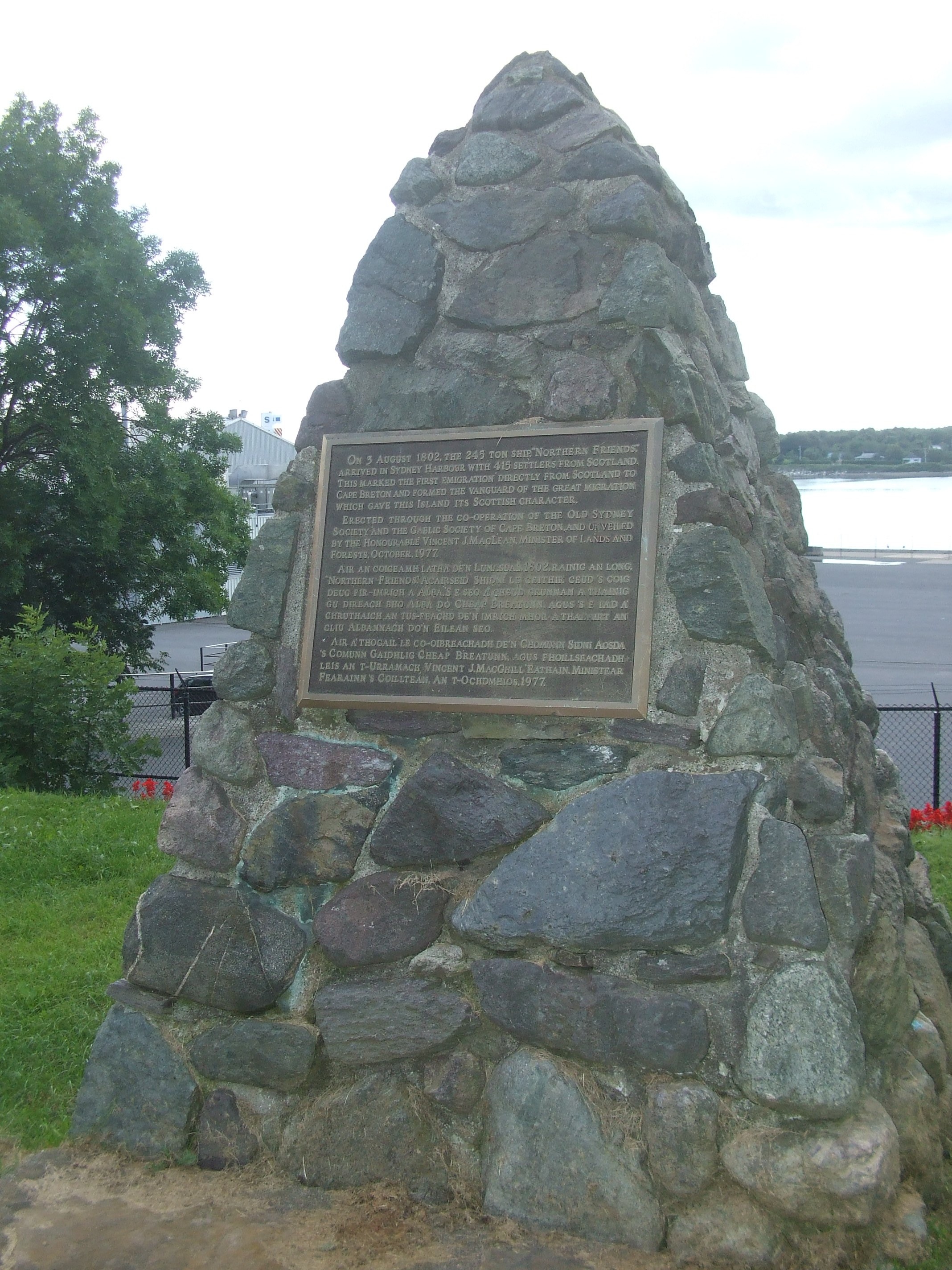
Plaque commemorating the arrival of Scottish immigrants in Cape Breton

The first peoples of Nova Scotia, the Mi'kmaq, lived as hunters and traders. The Norse adventurers discovered Nova Scotian coasts, and Europeans reached the first agricultural settlement.

In the early 19th century much was developed in Nova Scotia, including the fishing and logging industries. Since 1950 there has been a financial struggle. The fishing industry (lobster and shellfish) has helped support the economy of Nova Scotia.

== Major agricultural products ==
=== Crops ===
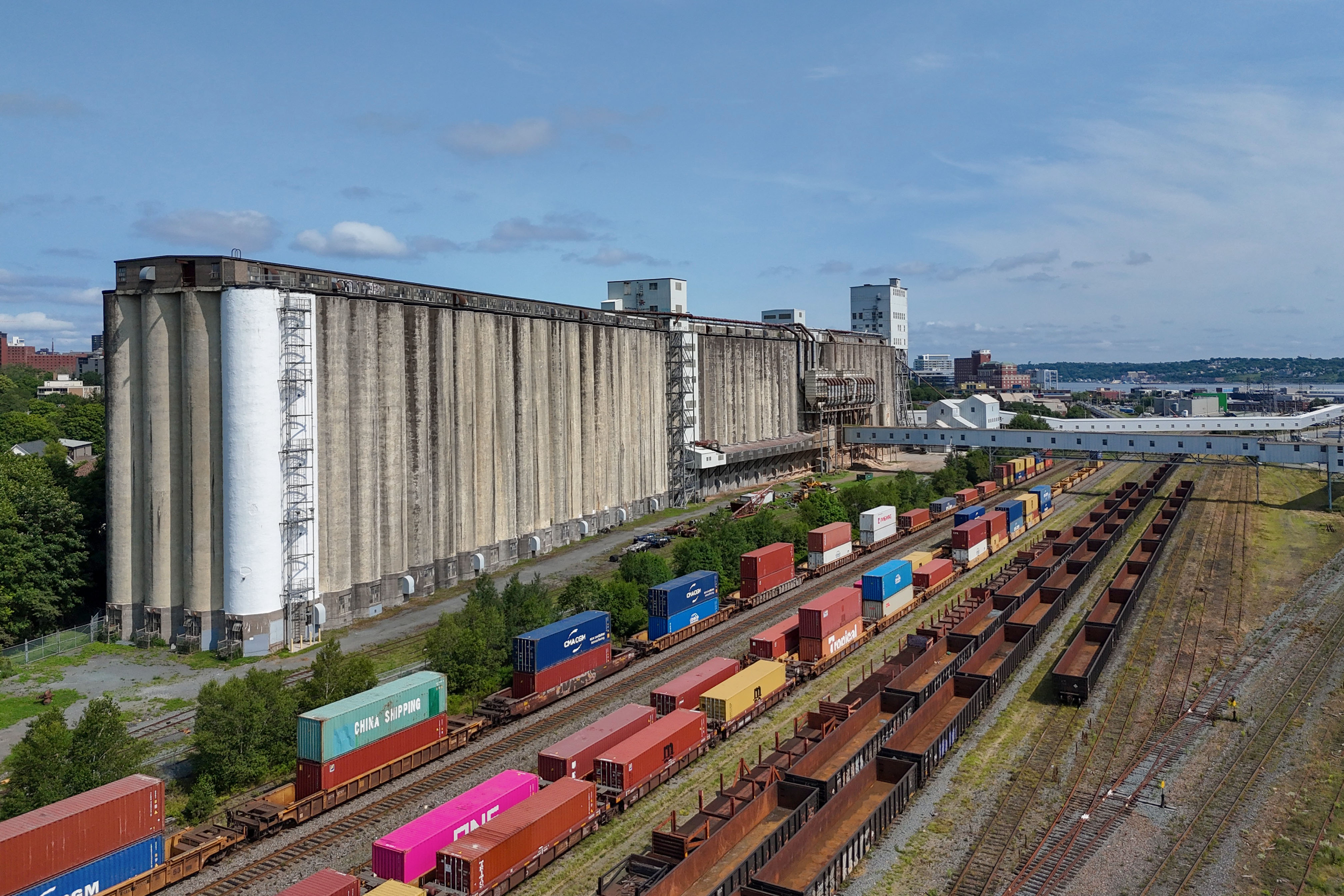
Halifax Grain Elevator stores and exports commodities such as grains, soybeans, and wood pellets

Some of the major crops include grains, forages, carrots, broccoli, apples, grapes, blueberries as well as many other fruits and vegetables.

Blueberries are a particularly important crop for Nova Scotia. The lowbush blueberry is endemic to Eastern North America and is well adapted to the acidic soils found in Nova Scotia. Lowbush blueberries are typically cultivated on abandoned farmland or other land that is seen as unproductive. There are over 1,000 producers and over 40,000 acres devoted to blueberry production, which makes the blueberry the largest fruit crop in Nova Scotia.

Grape production in Nova Scotia is a growing industry that is attempting to increase production. The government of Nova Scotia spent $1 million in 2015 with the goal of doubling grape production by 2020. There are currently 632 acres of land in grape production. Nova Scotian growers employ a wide range of grape cultivars in order to create a wines such as L'Acadie Blanc, Castel, Cayuga, Ortega. Many of these cultivars are French hybrid varieties suitable to the cooler climate in Nova Scotia.

=== Horticulture ===
Wild flowers such as mayflower, pitcher plant, white water lily and a variety of violets grow throughout Nova Scotia. The Horticulture Nova Scotia (HNS) is a group that help educate people about horticulture in Nova Scotia involving the production, marketing, communication, and business management.

=== Forestry ===
The original forests of Nova Scotia took many years for the settlers to clear in order to perform other forms of agriculture on the land.

Hardwood and coniferous trees are grown throughout Nova Scotia. Nova Scotia has over 4 million ha of forest, which has always been an important part of the provincial economy. Common soft woods include Eastern white pine, spruce, and balsam fir, as well as hardwoods such as red maple, sugar maple and yellow birch.

Nova Scotia also has a well established maple syrup production. The heavy snowfall in 2015 caused damage to farmers trees. In January 2016 $950,000 was invested by Nova Scotia's Agriculture Department to help farmers re-establish their sap collection systems.

=== Poultry and eggs ===
Nova Scotia has the largest poultry production in Atlantic Canada with approximately 43 million kg of chicken, and 4.5 million kg of turkey in 2005. Poultry production is governed by supply management, guaranteeing a reliable and affordable supply of product to consumers. There are approximately 84 chicken growers in the province who produce approximately 43 million kg of meat and 17,493,000 dozen eggs annually.

=== Dairy ===
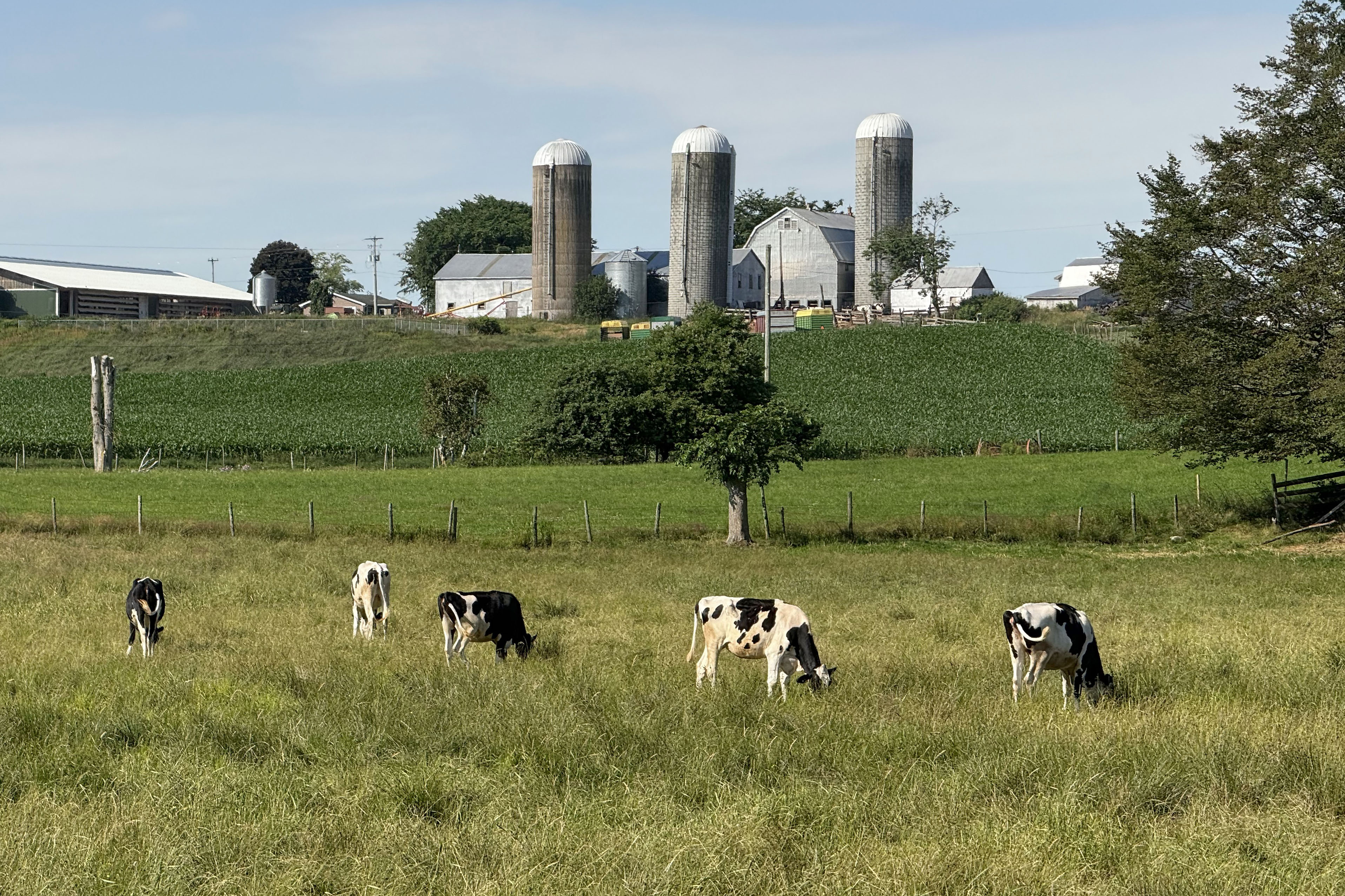
A dairy in Pictou

Dairy is one of the largest agricultural industries in Nova Scotia. There are 203 farms that are part of the Dairy Farmers of Nova Scotia, the governing body that administers supply management system and sets the price of milk. The production exceeds 206 million litres of milk annually representing approximately $165 million of farmgate revenue per year and providing over 600 jobs. A majority of this milk is processed at one of the 6 dairy processing plants, or 2 producer/processors in Nova Scotia. The remainder being processed out-of-province. There are two main types of dairy systems in Nova Scotia; pasture-based and confinement-based. Industry trends are pushing Nova Scotian dairy farms toward fewer, larger, confinement-based systems.

=== Livestock ===
Livestock production in Nova Scotia consists of beef (108, 500), sheep (25,000), goat (2,000), pigs (95,000), and mink (984,000). These livestock are used for different yields such as milk, wool, meat and furs.

Global trends of livestock operation consolidation have been hard on Nova Scotian producers. Once considered a grass-fed beef region, Nova Scotian beef producers are at a competitive disadvantage to Midwestern grain producing regions that can export carcasses cheaper than Nova Scotians can import grain. Similarly, the pig industry has been greatly diminished in Nova Scotia and relies heavily on subsidy.

=== Aquaculture ===
The aquaculture industry in Canada is small but growing, with Canada's extensive coastline providing many opportunities for expansion of the aquaculture industry. Nova Scotia's Department of Fisheries and Agriculture has pledged to provide an economically, environmentally, and socially sustainable aquaculture industry which creates year-round jobs and increased wealth throughout rural coastal Nova Scotia, while mitigating overfishing impacts, and allowing wild stocks to replenish.

The combination of increased global demand for animal protein and innovation in aquaculture production systems have resulted in rapid expansion of the sector, with production value in Nova Scotia reaching $88,608,000 by 2018. There are many finfish and shellfish species farmed between Nova Scotia's 200+ issued aquaculture leases. These include blue mussel, American oyster, rainbow trout, and Atlantic salmon.

=== Organic Farms ===
There are approximately 359 farms involved in organic production in Nova Scotia. The majority of these farms are not certified for organic products. 17% are certified, 3.9% are transitioning to certification and 81.9% are not as of 2016. The majority of the organic crops produced in Nova Scotia include fruits, vegetables, and various greenhouse products.

== Economy ==
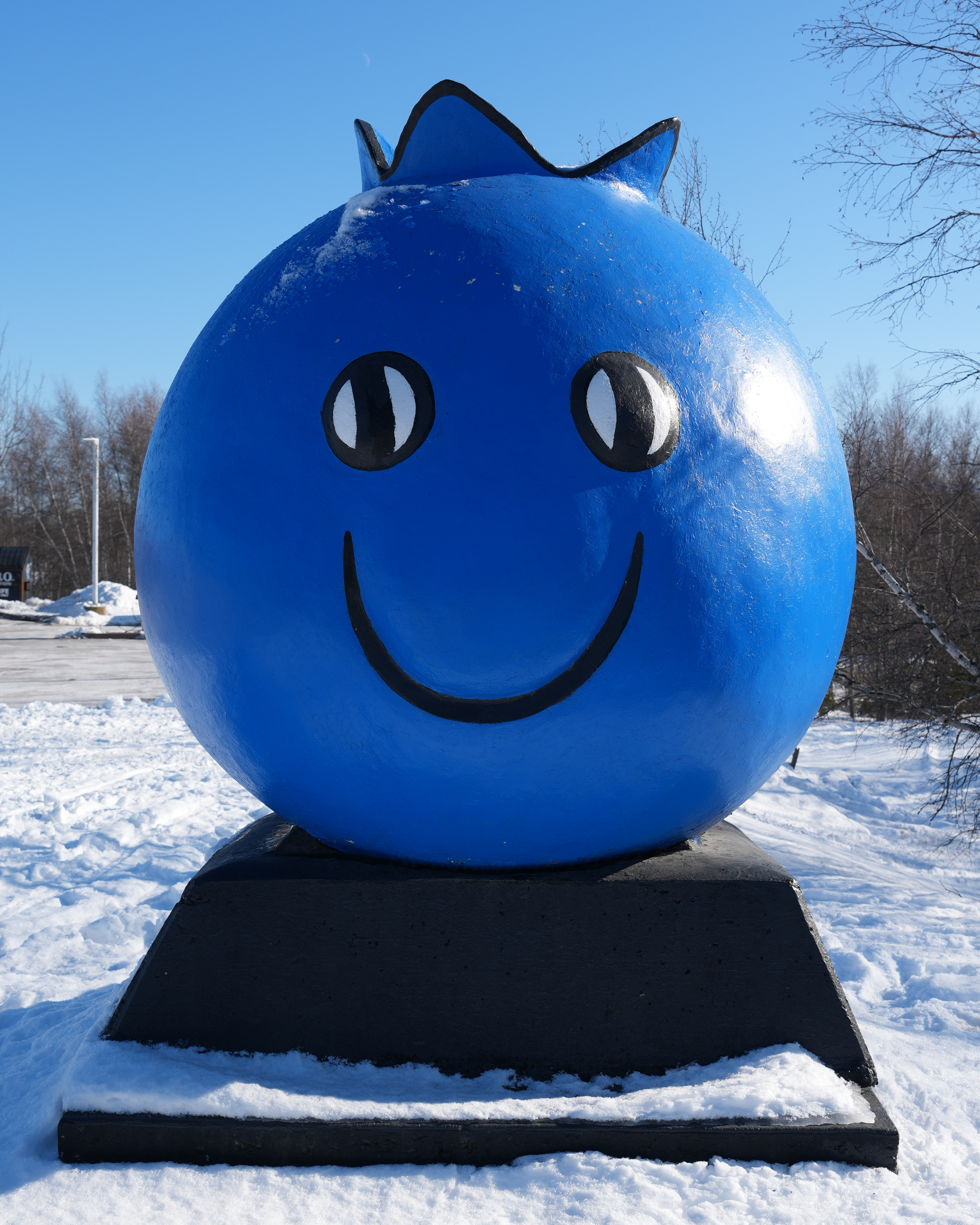
Statue in Oxford, celebrating the town's frozen blueberry industry

The government of Canada has several programs for farmers to aid production costs. Many of these programs are contributed to by the farmers themselves similar to an insurance plan.

The government started a new program that will qualify farmers who donate their spare food to the local food banks for a tax credit, available since January 1, 2017. The government is also helping tree fruit crop growers due to the losses from a fire blight outbreak, they are providing 2.69 million dollars to help bring this under control and minimize damages.

The blueberry industry is a primary export for Nova Scotia's economy, generating 70 million dollars in worldwide exports.

The field of aquaculture also contributes to a large portion of the province's economy, generating over 1.68 billion. These numbers are rising as demand and improvement in practices increase as well as new innovation in farmed fisheries.

Agritourism provides new opportunities to grow the agricultural economy and increase the sustainability within the farming system. Initiatives including farm markets, wineries, u-picks, and farm-based festivals contribute to Nova Scotia's economy by promoting the province’s rich farming history and culture.

== Other ==
=== Water ===
There are over 3000 lakes as well as many rivers and streams throughout Nova Scotia. Water in Nova Scotia has also played a prominent role in the forestry sector throughout its history. The provincial government of Nova Scotia has helped with the land use planning in many areas such as the Annapolis Valley in an attempt to reduce the groundwater issues and drinking water contamination. Local governments have also sought to remediate these issues by working with the community to understand what needs to be done.

=== Soil ===
There are many areas throughout Nova Scotia that have very fertile soil such as the Annapolis Valley and Cornwallis Valley. The soils in Nova Scotia are mostly acidic; only 29% of the land is suitable for agriculture. The best land is in the lowlands where the soil has had the opportunity to develop into deeper soils. The soils in the uplands tend to be shallower and more rocky making them less fertile.

These lowlands, mostly marshlands, consist of fertile alluvial flood plains and river valleys. These lands are easily cultivable, and were formerly used often by early Nova Scotian settlers.

=== Topography ===
The land of Nova Scotia varies from coast to coast, including rugged coastlines, inlets, islands, coves, and bays, to large lowlands connecting the various parts of the landscape. In these lowlands there are various valleys that have been formed during the Triassic period. Areas such as the Bay of Fundy now play a notable role in the field of agriculture because of the marshlands formed by the high tides. Once dykes were built, these lands could be harnessed for crops. These dykes were built by the French Settlers in order to secure the salt they needed for curing the fish, and the land around these dykes was later used for agriculture. These structures have since been rebuilt and maintained by the Department of Agriculture.
