= Halifax Seaport =

Coordinates: 44°38′55.28″N 63°34′8.55″W

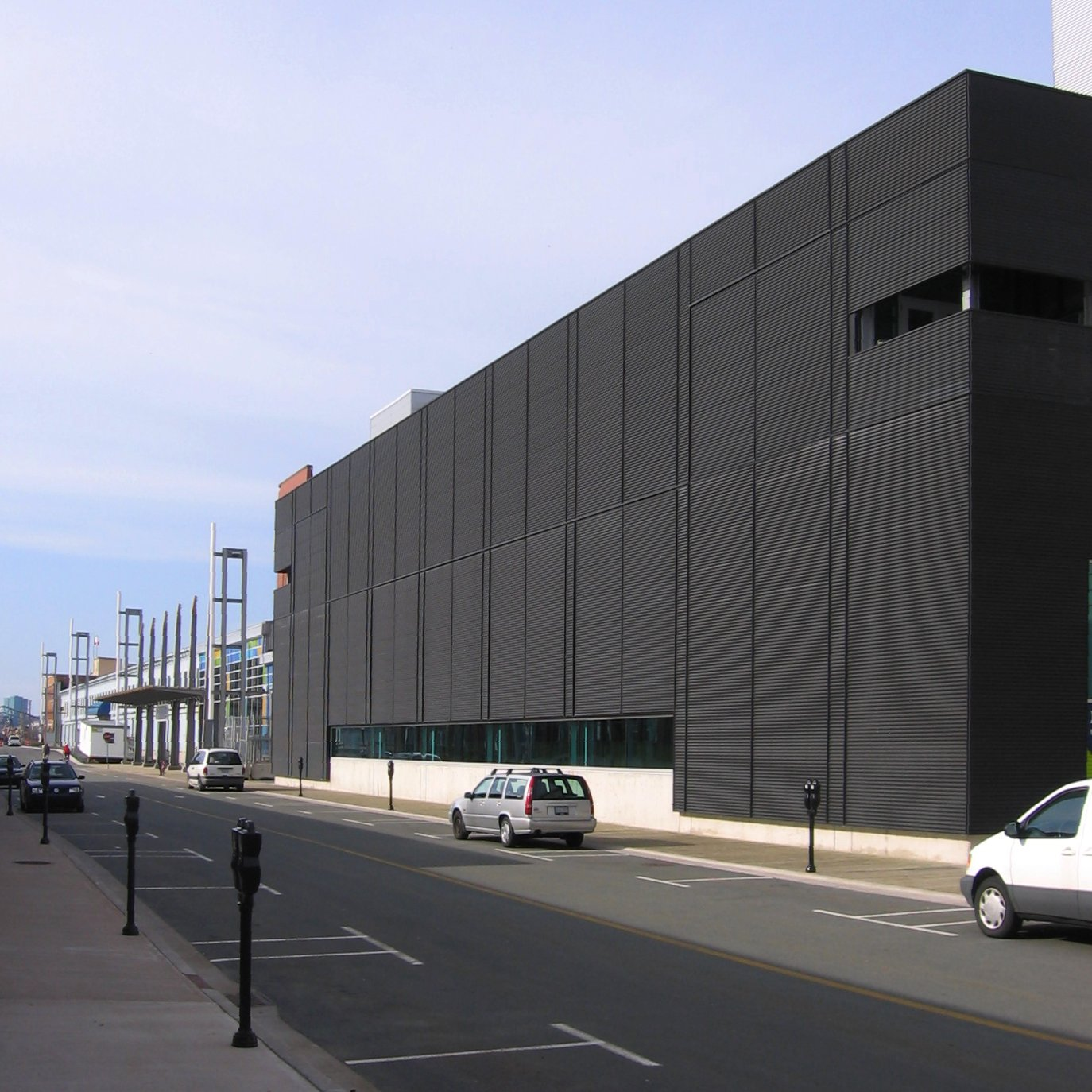
NSCAD University is one of the tenants of Halifax Seaport.The former Halifax Farmers Market is in the background.

The Halifax Seaport is a Canadian commercial development located on the Halifax, Nova Scotia waterfront, at the southern end of the Halifax Boardwalk. It is a re-use of former shipping warehouses. The intent of the multi-year project is to create a thriving new arts and culture district in the city.

Notable tenants include NSCAD University, the Halifax Farmers' Market, a cruise ship terminal, the Canadian Museum of Immigration at Pier 21, and the Cunard Centre, a multi-purpose events venue. The Seaport is managed by the Halifax Port Authority.

== See also ==
- Discovery Centre – a new adjacent museum
- Westin Nova Scotian – an adjacent hotel
