= Kissinger cables =

1973–76 US government records leaked by WikiLeaks in 2013

- Created: 1973–1976
- Media type: Digital database (originally paper and microfilm)
- Purpose: Diplomatic cables, intelligence reporting, and official foreign policy correspondence

The Kissinger cables are 1.7 million United States diplomatic and intelligence records dating from 1973 to 1976 that had previously been declassified and released by the National Archives and Records Administration and were republished in searchable form by WikiLeaks in April 2013. At the time of the cables, Henry Kissinger was the United States Secretary of State and National Security Advisor. The cables can be searched using a search engine provided by WikiLeaks at the Public Library of United States Diplomacy, a special page on the WikiLeaks website.

== Content ==
The Kissinger cables revealed that:

- Yasser Arafat, President of the Palestinian National Authority, was a key asset to the U.S. foreign policy in the Middle East. According to the cables, the Americans were keen to have Arafat on their side. Kissinger and his State Department believed that solving the Arab–Israeli conflict would win the good will of the Arabs and thwart the Soviet's regional ambitions.
- Kissinger and State Department were doubtful of Margaret Thatcher's prospects of becoming the prime minister of the United Kingdom because of her "immaculate grooming" and "imperious manner", and "None of this goes down well with the working class of England".
- The Vatican dismissed reports of massacres committed by Chilean dictator Augusto Pinochet as "propaganda". After realising the full extent of the human rights violations being carried out, the Vatican still refused to criticise Pinochet's regime openly and continued with normal diplomatic relations.
- George Fernandes, chairman of the Socialist Party of India, who had faced prosecution for conspiracy against the government of Prime Minister Indira Gandhi, sought to obtain funding from the U.S. Central Intelligence Agency and the French government in order to organize underground sabotage activities. After an initial request to seek funding from the French government was turned down, U.S. diplomatic cables showed that he was "prepared to accept money from the CIA".
