= Immigration Building =

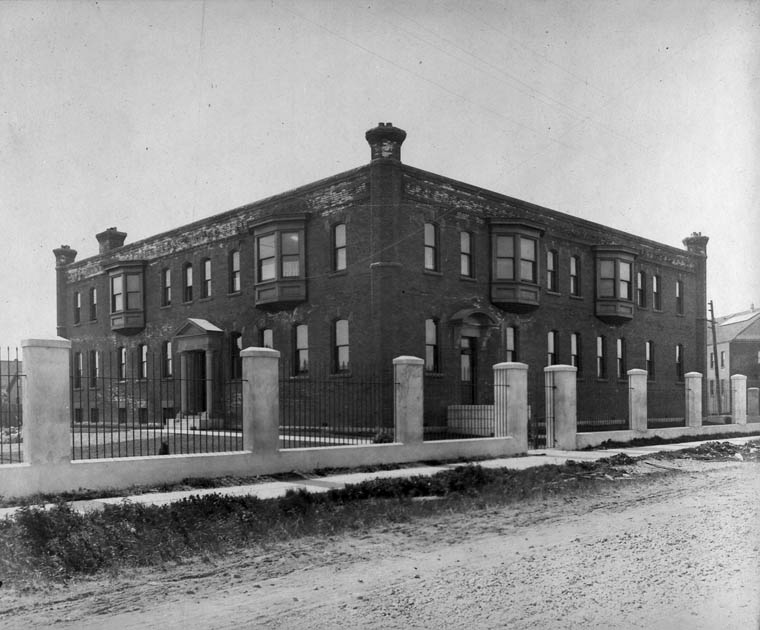
- Immigration Building in 1909

General information
- Location: Victoria, British Columbia
- Coordinates: 48.4210°N 123.3847°W
- Opened: 1909
- Closed: 1958
- Demolished: 1978
- Owner: Dominion government

Technical details
- Floor count: 2

The Immigration Building, also known as Dominion Immigration House, was located at the corner of Ontario Street and Dallas Road in the James Bay neighbourhood of Victoria, British Columbia. Between 1909 and 1957, thousands of immigrants to Canada were detained and processed in the building, which closed in 1958 and was demolished in 1978. The site, now occupied by townhouses, was given formal heritage recognition in 2016.

== Architecture ==
The two-storey red-brick building housed medical facilities, immigration offices, and racially segregated wards. It was "designed to accommodate ninety-six Hindus, thirty-six women, twenty-four Chinese, forty-eight Japanese, and sixteen others". The provincial government describes the building as a "formidable, prison-like structure, constructed of brick with interior concrete walls and bars across the windows". The basement had a kitchen, the first floor had a reception room and a large dining room, while the second storey was "partitioned by strong concrete walls into cells".

== History ==
Major arrivals of immigrants to Victoria by sea began in 1862. During the following decades, the growing city's immigration facilities were housed in a variety of ad hoc premises, including a former barracks. The immigration infrastructure was considered inadequate, prompting the Canadian government to construct a permanent Immigration Building, which opened on 13 November 1909. Funding of the project was controversial among members of parliament; some of those opposed sought an end to Asian immigration, and since Victoria received relatively few white immigrants by sea, they regarded the new building as useless.

According to University of Victoria professor David Chuenyan Lai (1937–2018), migrant-carrying ships from Hong Kong berthed at Rithet's Wharf, and from there the newcomers were marched to the Immigration Building, where they were examined and required to pay head tax (in accordance with the Chinese Immigration Act, 1885). They were detained in the building under a variety of circumstances, including an inability to pay the head tax (in which case they were sent back); if they were deemed "physically defective"; if the number of arriving passengers exceeded the processing capacity of the immigration facilities; or if they were found to have made false statements in their immigration forms. The Chinese consul-general to Canada, Chilean Tsur, visited the immigration facilities in Victoria and in 1923 spoke out against the conditions there, stating that "the Canadian people should treat the Chinese fairly, as the Chinese treat Canadian merchants and travellers who visit China."

Chinese immigration to Canada was effectively halted by the Chinese Exclusion Act of 1923, after which the Immigration Building continued processing immigrants from other Asian countries. Various factors contributed to Vancouver becoming a far more important destination for new arrivals than Victoria, and due to prolonged underuse, the Immigration Building closed in 1958. The site was purchased by the Victoria Machinery Depot. In the 1970s, community groups tried to save the building for reuse as a community centre to no avail. The building was demolished in 1977/78 by the owner of the Victoria Machinery Depot.

Prior to the building's demolition, various messages and poems were uncovered, beneath layers of paint, written in Chinese by migrants imprisoned at the building. These revealed the "inner anguish of the early Asian immigrants to British Columbia", many of whom did not know English and did not understand why they were imprisoned. Professor Lai salvaged some of these writings and donated them to the Royal British Columbia Museum.

== Recognition ==
Between November 2013 and January 2014, public consultation was carried out in preparation for a formal apology by the British Columbia government (given in May 2014) for historical wrongs against Chinese Canadians. One of the recommendations resulting from the consultation was that a provincial inventory of historic sites and artifacts should be carried out to help preserve the cultural history of Chinese Canadians. In January 2015, the BC government began inviting nominations for Chinese-Canadian historical sites, resulting in the identification of 77 places including the Immigration Building.

The site of the former Immigration Building was designated a Provincially Recognized Heritage Site, under the Heritage Conservation Act, by the BC government on 27 January 2016, and was consequently recorded in the Canadian Register of Historic Places on 2 June 2017. The register notes the heritage value of the site as follows (excerpt):

"The Dominion Immigration House Site is important for its historical, cultural and spiritual values, primarily for its former use as a federal government centre for immigrants arriving from Asia to the west coast of Canada, and as a reminder of the unjust imprisonment and bureaucratic racism that took place there. [...] The Dominion Immigration House Site is valuable for its association with the systemic racism that greeted Chinese and other immigrants upon their arrival in Canada, and as a reminder of past restrictive government regulations for Asian immigration enacted through legislation such as the Chinese Immigration Act and the Head Tax. The enforcement of these exclusionary immigration policies by officers at the Immigration House often meant the segregation of detainees based on cultural background, with immigrants being held for days or even months before being interviewed, and enduring lengthy and intense interrogation." – Heritage Branch, Province of British Columbia

The site is now home to a townhouse development surrounded by a low wall. There are three identical memorial plaques on the wall, one facing each of the three surrounding streets, that explain the property's historic significance.

== See also ==
- History of Chinese immigration to Canada
