= South Park School =

School building in Victoria, British Columbia

South Park Family School
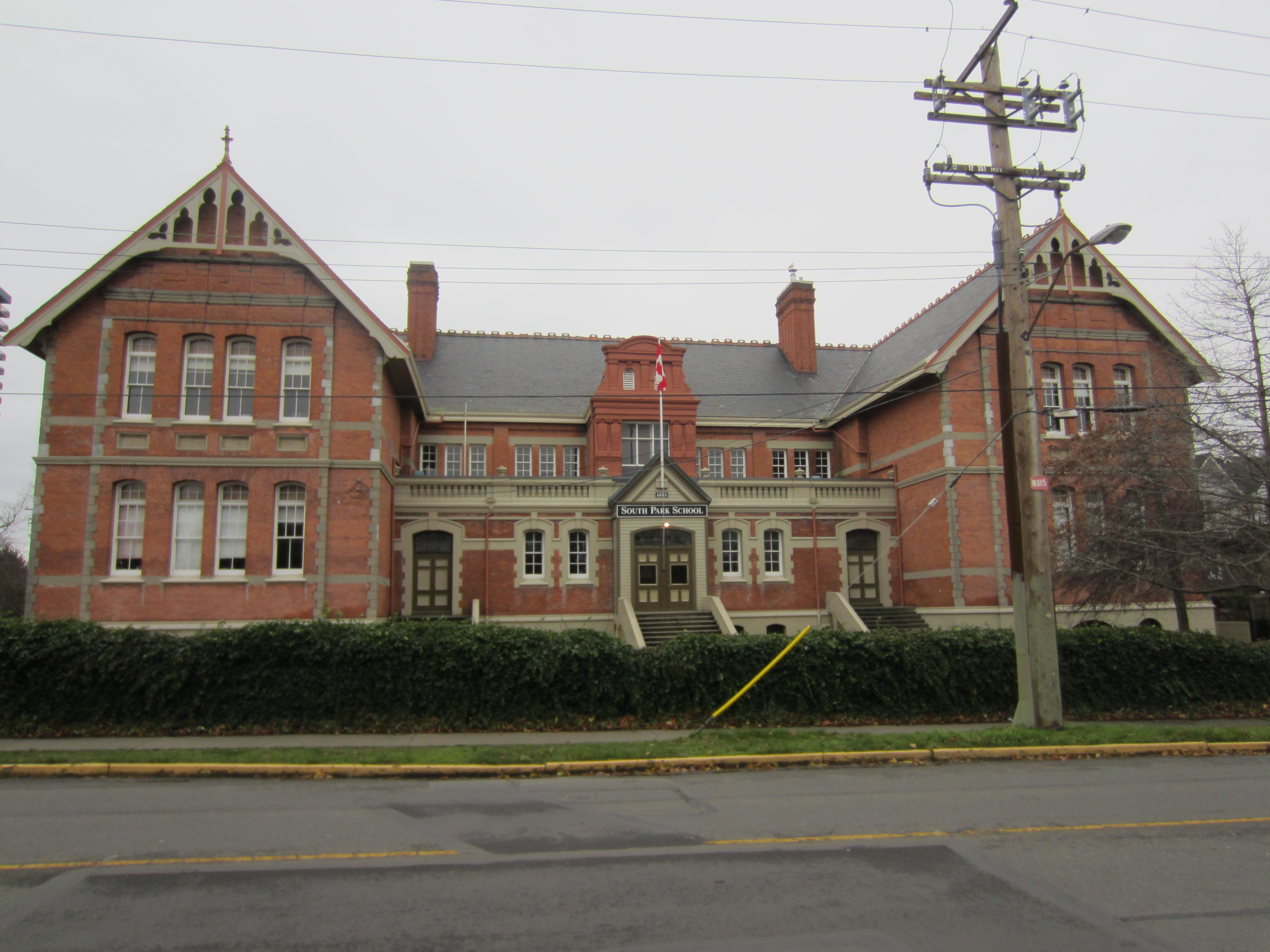
- The building's exterior in 2012

General information
- Location: 508 Douglas St., Victoria, British Columbia, Canada
- Coordinates: 48.4178°N 123.3663°W

Technical details
- Floor count: 3

South Park Family School is an elementary school in Victoria, British Columbia, Canada. It is located in a historic, two-storey Queen Anne style brick building located at 508 Douglas Street in Victoria's James Bay neighbourhood, across the road from Beacon Hill Park.

== See also ==
- List of historic places in Victoria, British Columbia
