= Pier 21 =

Former passenger ship terminal in Halifax, Canada

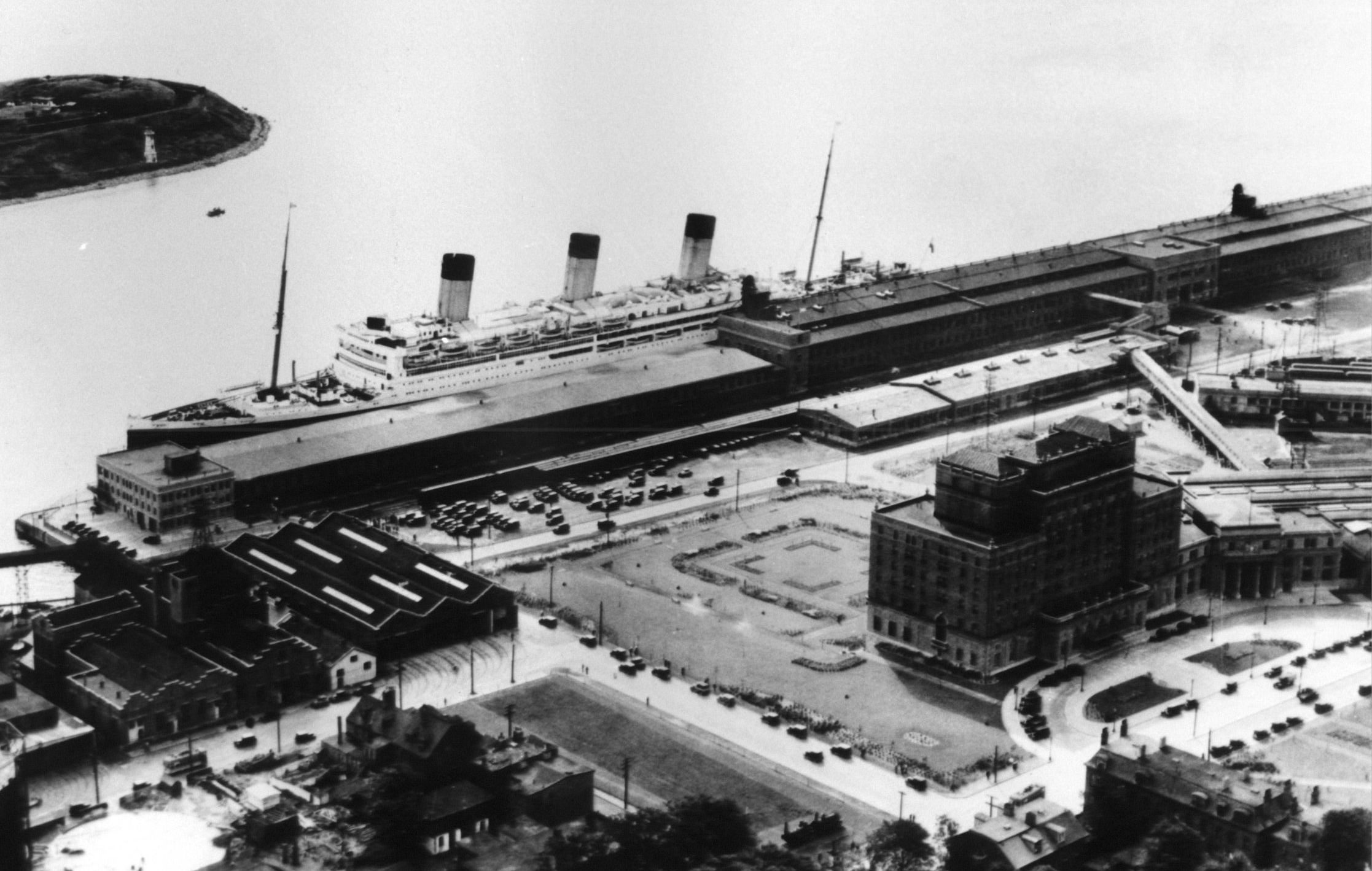
- Pier 21 in 1934 with RMS Majestic

- Location within Nova Scotia Location within Canada Location within North America
- 44°38′16″N 63°33′57″W
- Location: Halifax, Nova Scotia, Canada

History
- Built: 1928; 98 years ago

Site notes
- Area: 221,000 square feet (20,500 m^{2})

National Historic Site of Canada
- Official name: Pier 21 National Historic Site of Canada
- Designated: September 22, 1997

Pier 21 is a former ocean liner terminal and immigration shed from 1928 to 1971 in Halifax, Nova Scotia, Canada. Nearly one million immigrants came to Canada through Pier 21, and it is the last surviving seaport immigration facility in Canada. The facility is often compared to the landmark American immigration gateway Ellis Island. The former immigration facility is now occupied by the Canadian Museum of Immigration, the Nova Scotia College of Art and Design as well as various retail and studio tenants.

== Background ==
Halifax Harbour, along with Quebec City and Victoria, British Columbia were the major ports of entry for immigration to Canada in the steamship era. Pier 2 in Halifax's North End, also known as the "Deepwater Piers", was built in 1880 to process immigrants arriving on ocean liners. It also served as a major terminal for troopships and hospital ships in World War I. However, by 1913, the peak year of immigration in Canada, it was clear that the growing size of ocean liners and increase in immigration would require a larger facility. Plans were made for a new integrated ocean liner and railway facility in the South End of Halifax.

== Construction ==
Construction was delayed by World War I and the Halifax Explosion. However, by 1928 the Halifax Harbour Commission oversaw the completion of ocean terminals, a large complex of freight piers, grain elevators, a new train station and a 600-foot (183 m), two-story shed that would be home to Pier 21. The shed had an area of 221,000 square feet (20,500 m^{2}) for freight, and was built of steel truss-work with brick walls and wood roofs. It was divided into Pier 20, 21, and 22, and faced a long sea wall which could handle the biggest ocean liners in operation.

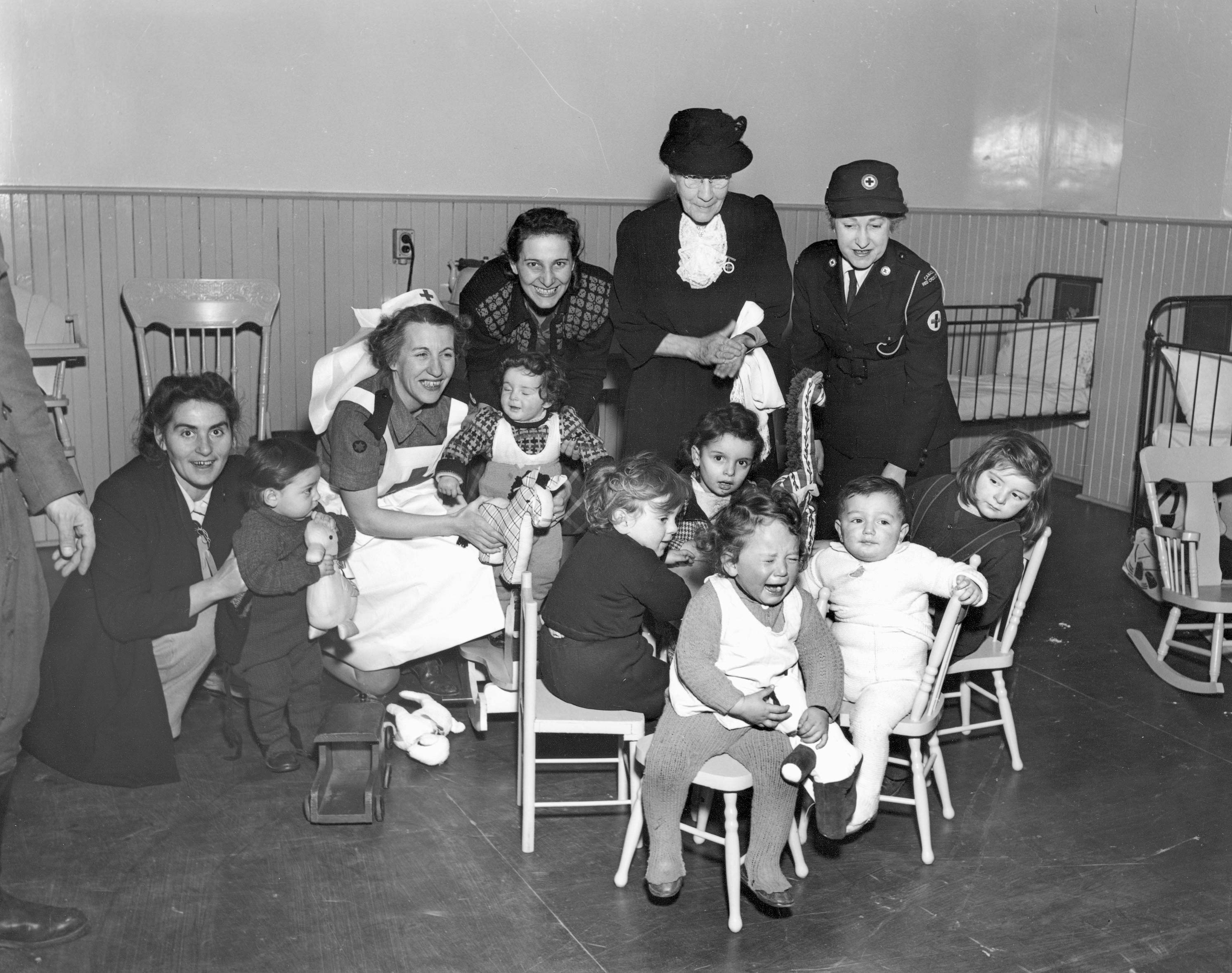
The Red Cross Nursery in the Pier 21 Annex, 1948

The immigration facility on the second floor of the shed at Pier 21 housed the assembly hall for immigrants, as well as medical and detention quarters. Adjacent to the Pier 21 shed was a two-story, brick annex building connected to the shed by an overhead walkway. The annex contained immigration offices, customs, a railway booking office and telegraph office as well as offices for immigration charities such as the Canadian Red Cross and a restaurant where immigrants could get meals before their long train journeys west. Railway passenger platforms on both sides of the annex served five long passenger and express tracks which served Pier 21. Special immigrant passenger trains, made up of dozens of colonist cars, would take passengers from Halifax to their new homes across Canada. A second overhead walkway crossed the tracks to connect the Pier 21 terminal to the Halifax, Nova Scotia railway station where more affluent travelers could board regularly scheduled trains such as the Ocean Limited.

== History ==
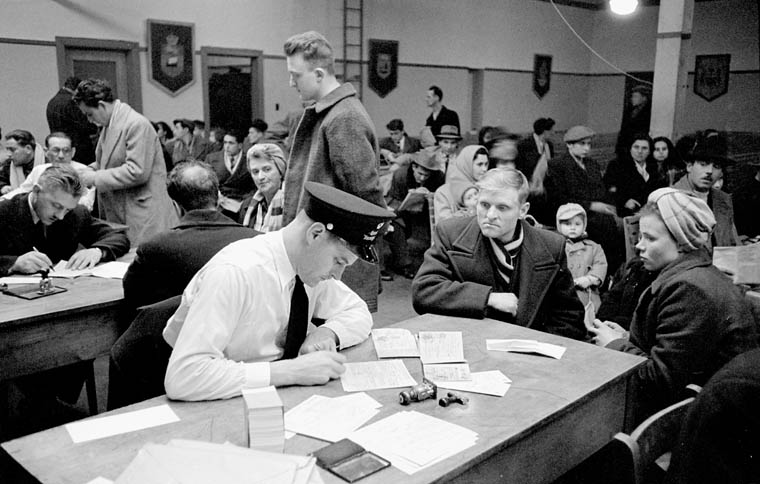
New arrivals at Pier 21 in 1952

Pier 21 opened on March 8, 1928, and the Holland America liner SS Nieuw Amsterdam (1905) became the first ship to bring immigrants to Canada through the new terminal. Pier 21 opened for business at the same time that Canada launched a fleet of ocean liners called "the Lady Boats" based at Pier 21 and operated by the Canadian National Steamship Line, introduced to the public at a special lunch, press conference and tour for travel agents hosted by RMS Lady Nelson at Pier 21 on November 27, 1928, where the immigration facility was acclaimed as "the finest on the continent" designed to give Canada a competitive presence in Atlantic travel routes.

Pier 21 would serve as a passenger terminal for trans-Atlantic Ocean liners from 1928 until 1971. The Pier was the primary point of entry for nearly one million immigrants and refugees from Europe and elsewhere, as well as the departure point for 496,000 military personnel Canadian troops during World War II. The facility became known informally as the 'Gateway to Canada.'

In its first years of operation, Pier 21 greeted many Dutch and English immigrants as well as workers sponsored by employers. However the Great Depression led to severe restrictions in immigration, and so arrival numbers fell. Pier 21 became a cruise ship destination during the Depression as giant liners were employed in summer recreational cruises from New York to Halifax, Nova Scotia during slack periods of Trans-Atlantic crossings. Pier 21 hosted the largest White Star liners such as RMS Olympic and RMS Majestic as well as the Cunard liners RMS Berengaria, RMS Mauretania, RMS Aquitania and the Red Star Line's Belgenland.

=== World War II ===
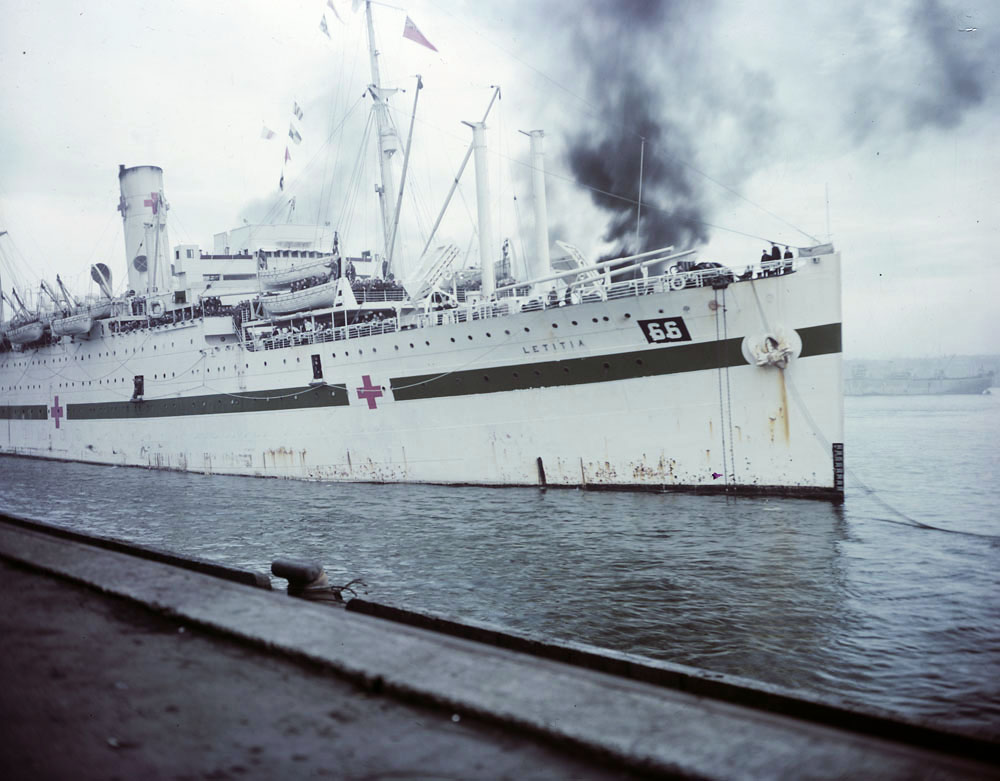
Letitia as a hospital ship arriving at Pier 21

The war almost completely halted immigration, but Pier 21 quickly became a major embarkation port for troop ships. Canadians and other Allied forces boarded hundreds of converted ocean liners ranging from the giants RMS Queen Mary and RMS Queen Elizabeth to smaller liners such as RMS Ascania. As the war continued, a special medical embarkation unit was established at Pier 21 to move wounded soldiers from hospital ships to special hospital trains as the hospital ships Lady Nelson and Letitia brought wounded Canadians home. Most of the over 90,000 aviators who came to Canada as part of the British Commonwealth Air Training Plan landed at Pier 21. Over 2,000 child evacuees from the United Kingdom arrived at Pier 21 during the war, fleeing the Blitz. Princess Juliana and Prince Bernhard of the Netherlands arrived at Pier 21 amidst ceremony aboard the Dutch cruiser HNLMS Sumatra in 1940 after the invasion of the Netherlands, en route to wartime refuge in Ottawa. Winston Churchill passed through Pier 21 four times, traveling in 1943 and 1944 to the Quebec Conference and the Washington Conference. During the latter trip he led a sing-along of "O Canada" and "The Maple Leaf Forever" at the Pier 21 railway platform where hundreds had gathered to see him. Enormous amounts of gold bullion were secretly shipped through Pier 21 during the war to banks in Ottawa and Montreal to safeguard currency reserves of beleaguered European nations. Britain alone shipped over 2.5 billion in gold reserves in 50 different shipments codenamed variously as "margarine" or "peanuts" from 1939 to 1941. At the war's end the Pier welcomed returning troops followed by war brides. A large fire heavily damaged Pier 21 on March 5, 1944, and the immigration department temporarily relocated until the full facility was reopened in December 1946.

=== Postwar ===
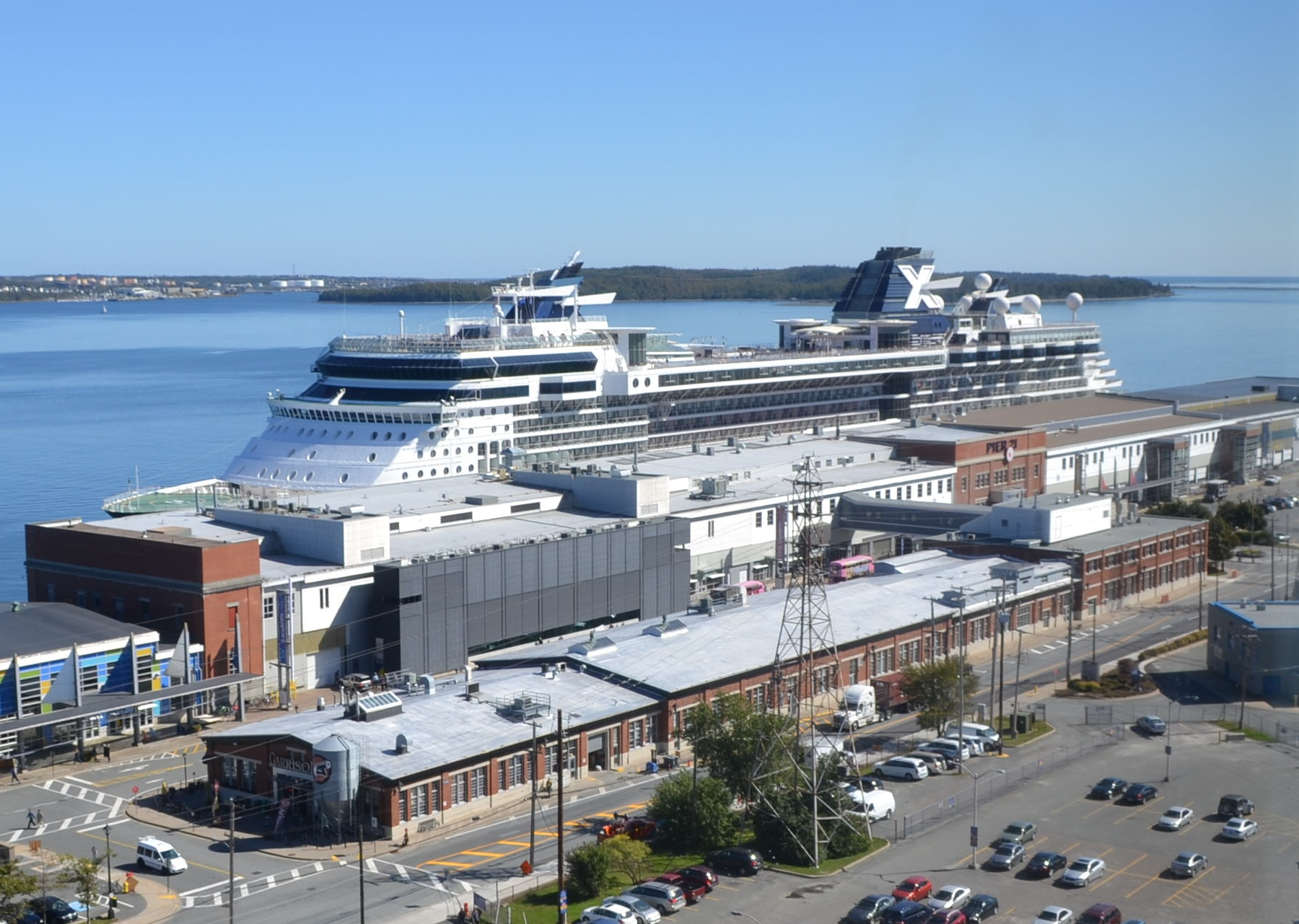
The Pier 21 complex in 2014 with a cruise ship docked at the former immigration shed and assembly hall. The immigration annex can be seen in the foreground, connected by an overhead walkway, through which immigrants walked from customs to the trains that took them across Canada.

Following the war brides, several major waves of immigrants arrived at Pier 21 beginning with the Displaced Person refugees from across Europe, including many Holocaust survivors. These refugees were followed by large numbers of post war economic immigrants from several European countries such as Britain, Italy, Germany and the Netherlands.

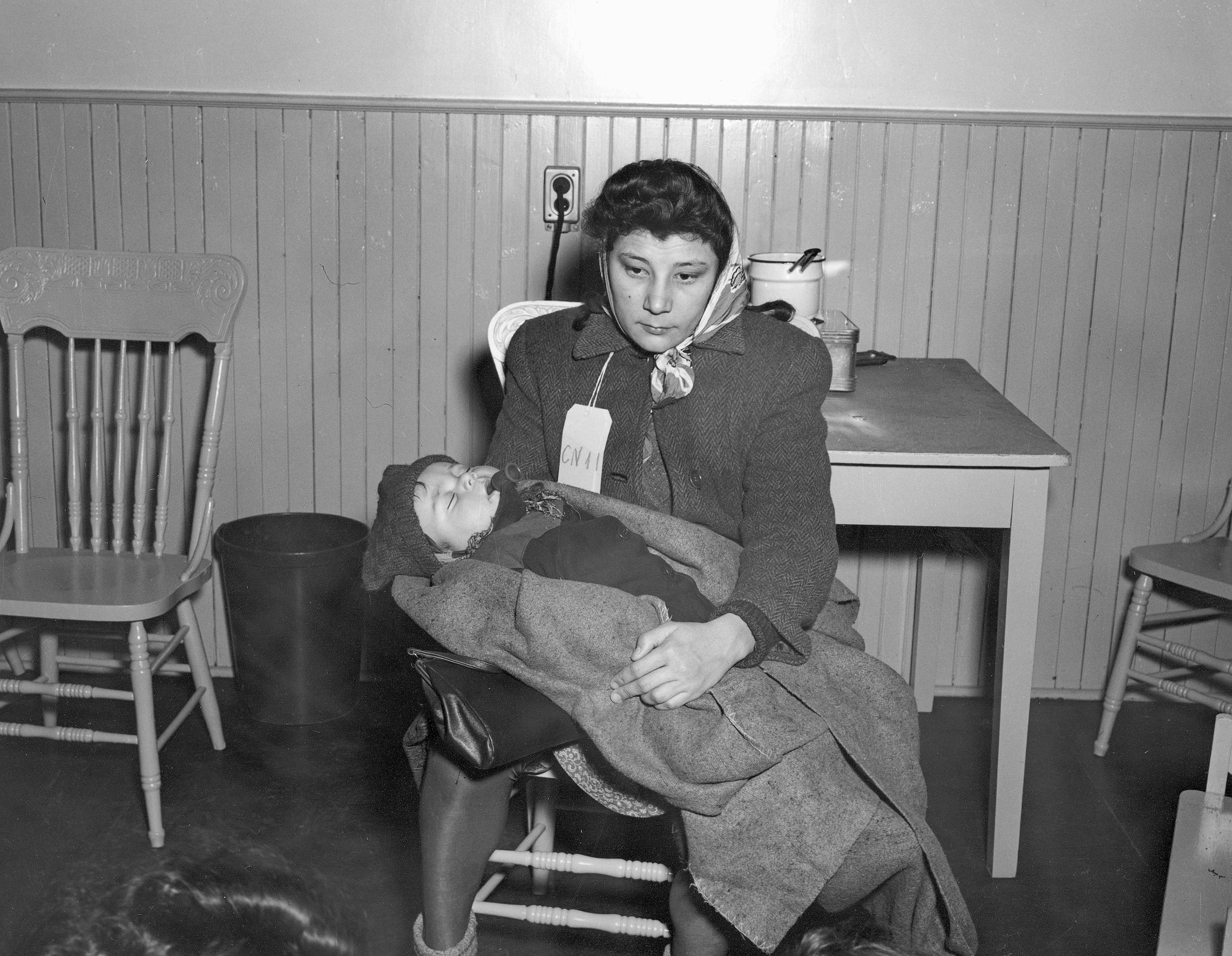
Displaced Person refugee with baby at Pier 21, 1948

One of the smallest ships to ever come to Pier 21, the former minesweeper SS Walnut arrived in 1948 packed with 347 refugees from the Baltic, triggering a controversy about their admittance to Canada which help shaped Canada's postwar refugee policies. The 1950s marked the peak years of immigration arrivals, about 45,000 per year, many of which were Italian-Canadians. A large two-story addition was built onto the immigration annex building in the 1950s to handle the heavy traffic of postwar European immigration. The Hungarian Uprising in 1956 brought another group of refugees to Pier 21, although some from this wave were now arriving by aircraft. The decline in ocean liner travel due to the rise of jet airliner travel during the 1960s caused immigration to shift to airports. With few ships calling at Pier 21, the terminal was used more often in its final years to handle overflow from airport immigration offices. The last major group of immigrants were 100 Cuban refugees from the Gander International Airport who were transferred to Pier 21 in 1970 to be accommodated while their refugee claims were processed. The last ship to bring immigrants to Pier 21 was the SS Cristoforo Colombo on March 30, 1971. Pier 21 closed its doors on March 31, 1971. A few other ships arrived in Halifax with immigrants after Pier 21 closed, but they were received by immigration officials working out of a downtown office.

=== Post-immigration use ===
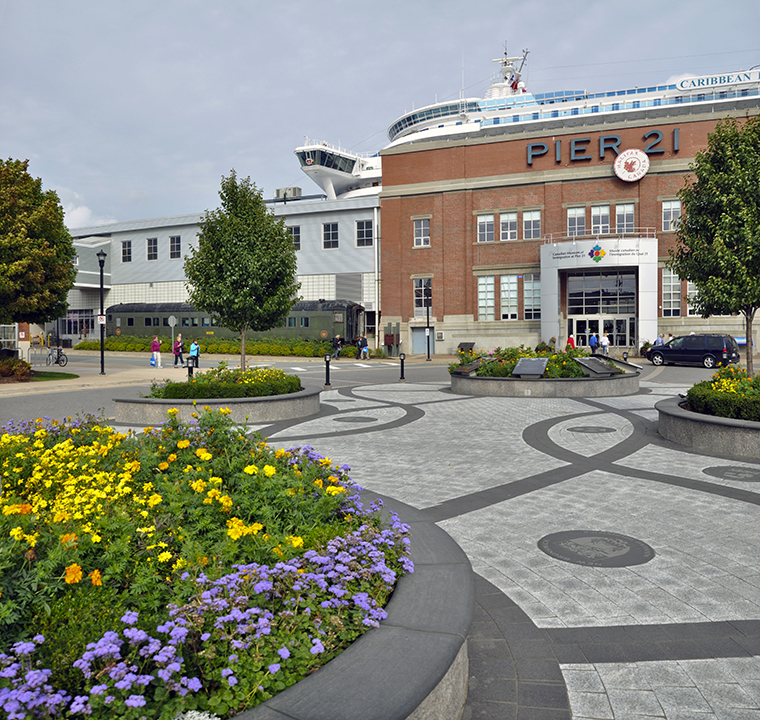
Pier 21 Museum in 2015

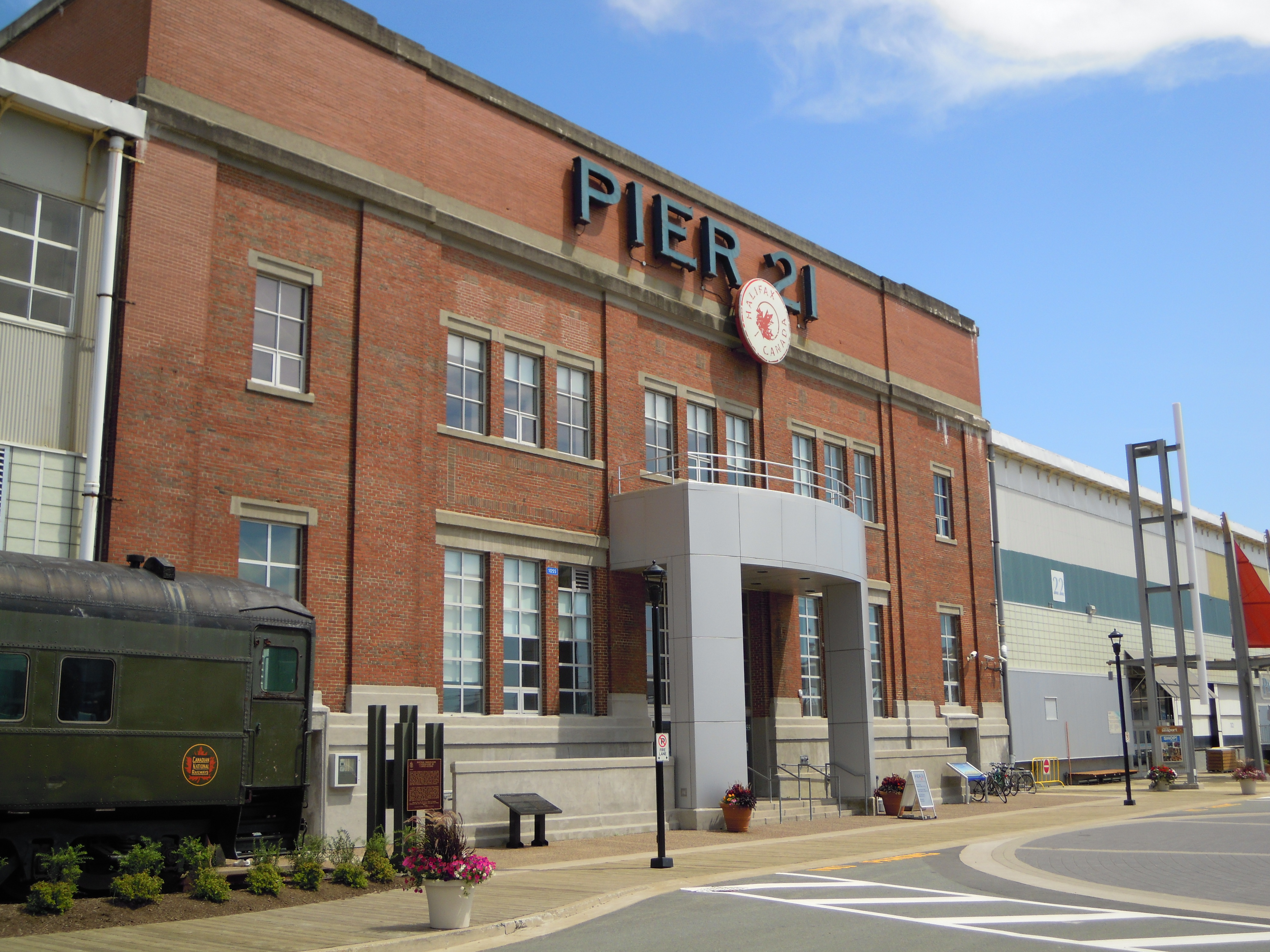
Main building

From the 1970s until 1991, the former immigration facility at Pier 21 housed the Nova Scotia Nautical Institute, a training facility for professional mariners. During the 1990s, the space provided studio and workshop space for artists. The Immigration annex was used by customs officials and the Halifax port's police. The growth of the cruise ship industry in the 1980s led to the return of large passenger ships to the Pier 21 wharves, however only for short recreational visits. Some of the former immigration terminal areas in Shed 20 and 22 was converted in stages to cruise ship passenger reception and retail spaces.

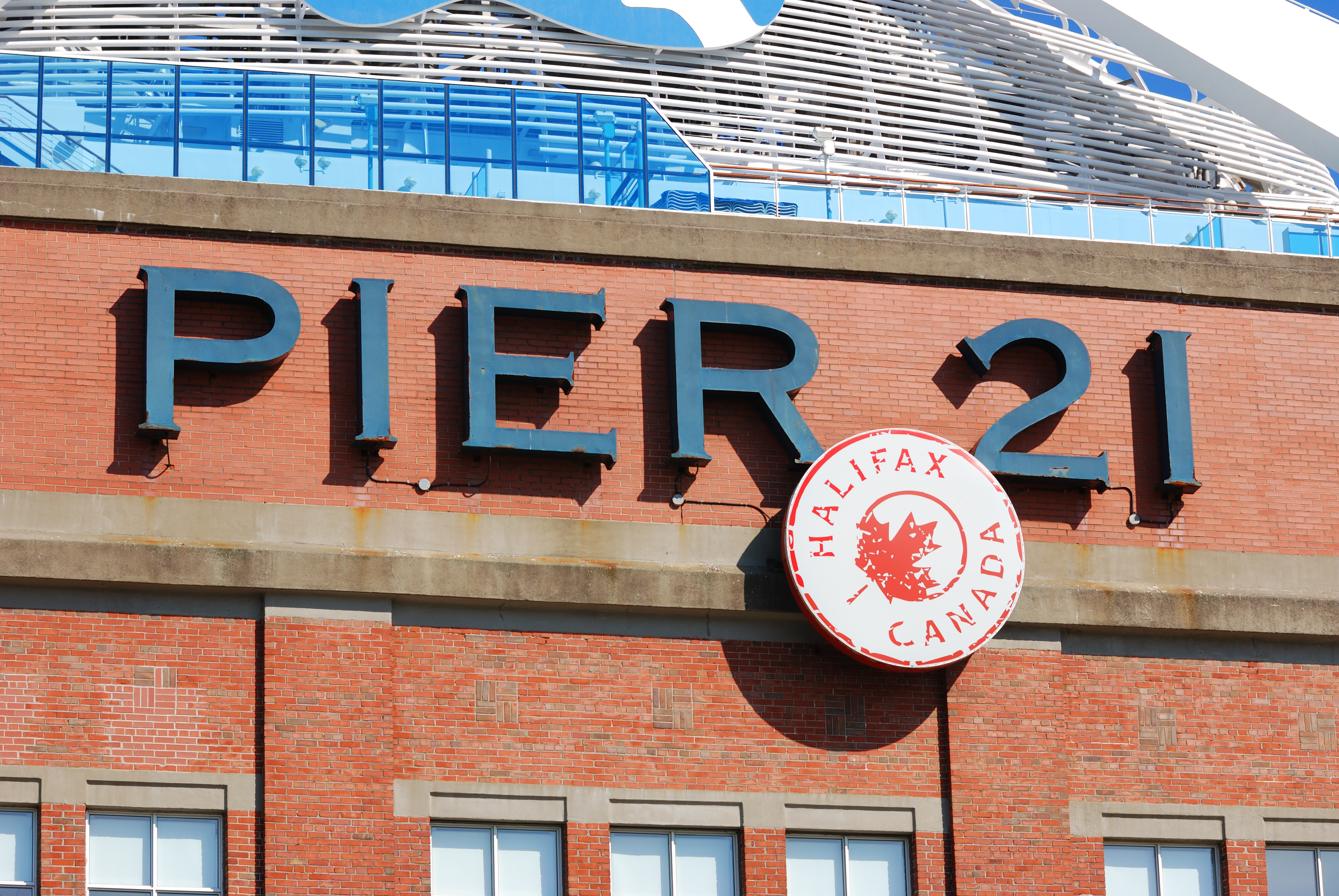
Close-up of Pier 21 logo

On September 22, 1997, the Pier 21 facility was designated a National Historic Site of Canada on the recommendation of the Historic Sites and Monuments Board of Canada because of the facility's major role in 20th century immigration in Canada and because it is the last surviving seaport immigration facility in Canada. The Pier 21 Society opened an interpretive centre in part of the former immigration facility in 1999. The society became the Canadian Museum of Immigration at Pier 21 in 2010, and occupied an expanded portion of the former immigration facility. The Nova Scotia College of Art and Design's seaport campus took over Pier 21's former medical, detention and accommodation wing in 2011. The Garrison brewing company leased a large portion of the immigration annex building in May 2006. A variety of retail shops as well as artists' and architects' studios and cultural organizations occupy the remainder of the immigration annex.

In late 2005, Pier 21's Carrie-Anne Smith and Vice Admiral Duncan "Dusty" Miller contributed wood from the building's rafters to the Six String Nation project. Part of that material now forms the X-brace on the interior of Voyageur, the guitar at the heart of the project.

== See also ==
- Eswyn Lyster – warbride author
- Halifax Grain Elevator – nearby industrial facility
- Immigration Building – former immigration facility in Victoria, BC
