= Halifax Farmers' Market =

Coordinates: 44°38′51.35″N 63°34′18.36″W

The Halifax Farmers' Market is the oldest continuously operating farmers' market in North America, having been founded in 1750. Over the years the market has been held in many locations around Halifax, Nova Scotia, including Keith's Brewery Building on 1496 Lower Water Street.

In 2010 the majority of the cooperative members of the market moved to a new building which is part of the Halifax Seaport and took on the name 'Halifax Seaport Farmers' Market'. A small number of vendors chose to remain in the old location and rebranded themselves as the 'Historic Farmers Market'. The Seaport market celebrated 265 years in October 2015.
