= Art Gallery of Nova Scotia =

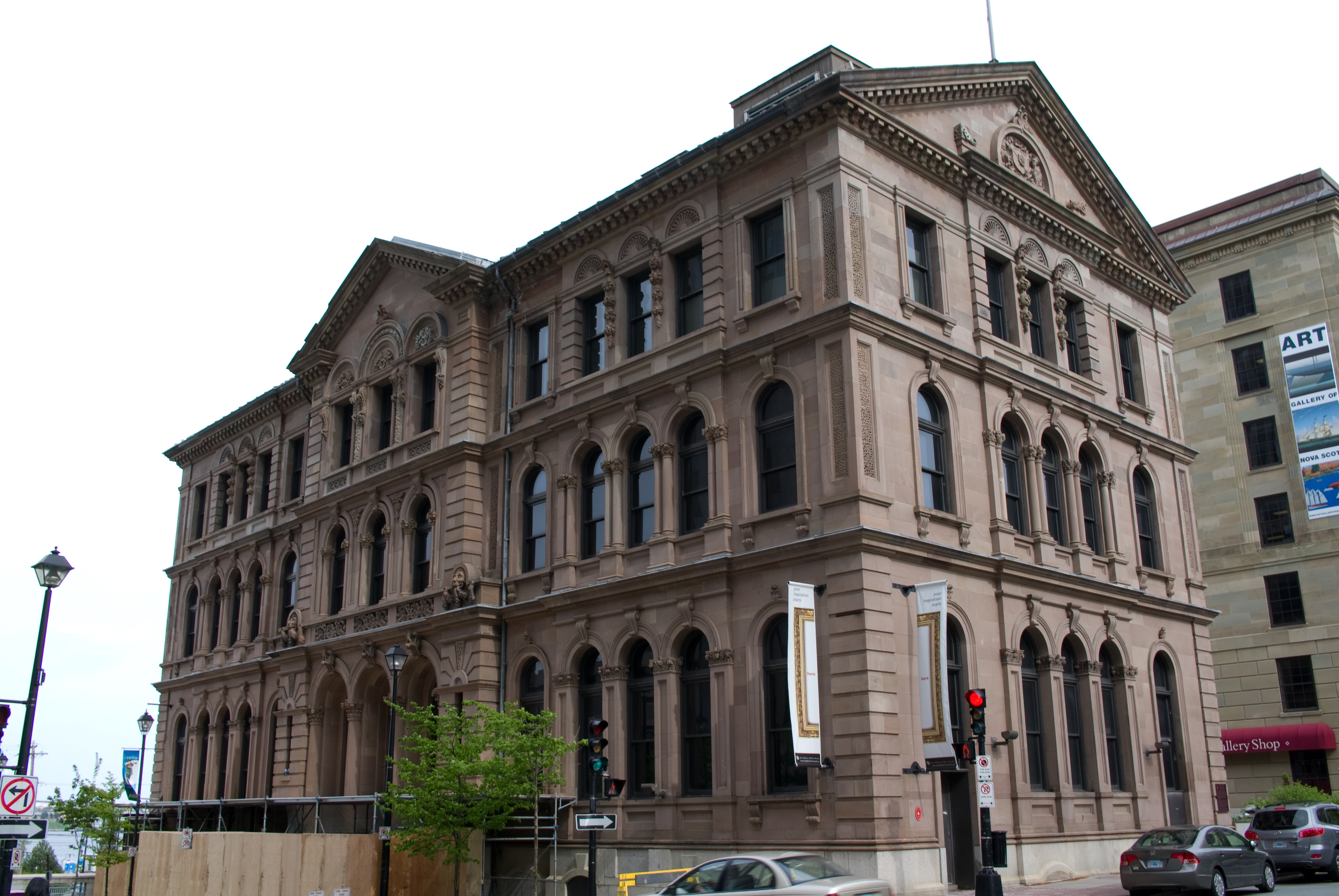
- Exterior facade of the Art Gallery of Nova Scotia's Dominion building in Halifax
- Established: 1908; 118 years ago
- Location: 1723 Hollis Street; Halifax, Nova Scotia, Canada
- Coordinates: 44°38′52.83″N 63°34′21.54″W
- Type: Art museum
- Collection size: Over 18,000
- Visitors: 45,455 (2017)
- CEO: Sarah Moore Fillmore
- Curator: David Diviney (Senior Curator)
- Website: agns.ca

The Art Gallery of Nova Scotia (AGNS) is a public provincial art museum based in Halifax, Nova Scotia, Canada. The art museum's primary building complex is located in downtown Halifax and takes up approximately 6,200 square metres (67,000 sq ft) of space. The museum complex comprises the former Dominion building and two floors of the adjacent Provincial building.

The museum was established in 1908 as the Nova Scotia Museum of Fine Arts and was renamed the Art Gallery of Nova Scotia in 1975. The museum moved into the Dominion building in 1988 and expanded the museum complex in 1998.

The museum's permanent collection has over 18,000 works by Nova Scotian, Canadian, and international artists. Its collection is exhibited in its main location in Halifax as well as its satellite branch in Yarmouth. In addition to exhibiting works from its permanent collection, the museum has also organized and hosted a number of travelling arts exhibitions.

Throughout its history, its staff has been an integral part of its legacy such as its former director Bernard Riordon, curator/director Ray Cronin and Registar/Curator of Collections Judy Dietz, among others.

== History ==
The art museum was founded as the Nova Scotia Museum of Fine Arts in 1908 in order to house the 200 works of the Crown of Nova Scotia. It was renamed the Art Gallery of Nova Scotia in 1975. During the museum's early history, the museum's collection and its exhibits moved between several locations, including at one point the gunpowder magazine of Citadel Hill.

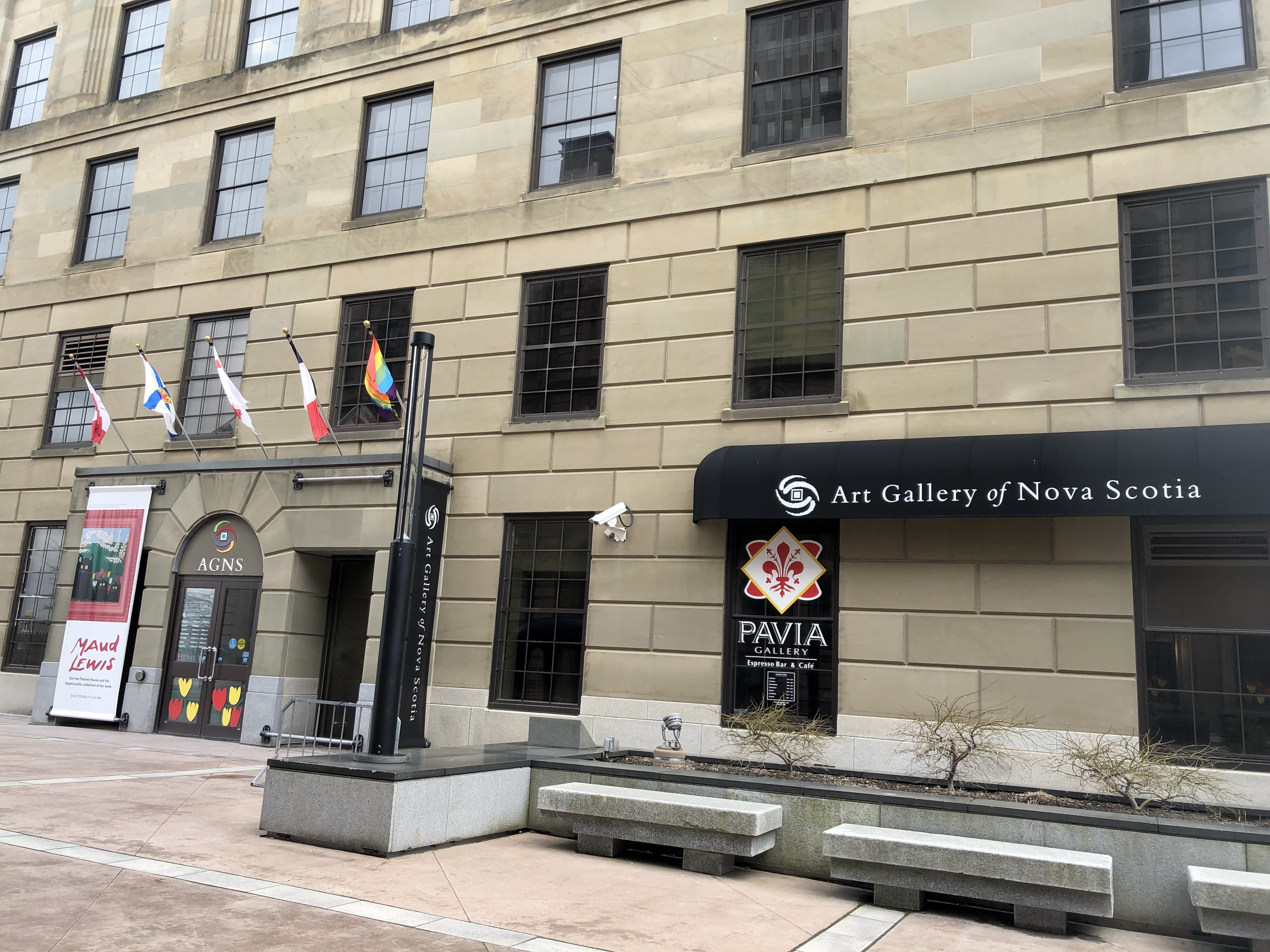
Access point to the museum at the Provincial Building. The museum expanded into the first two floors of the building in 1998.

In 1988, the museum moved to the Dominion Building, opened in 1867 and designed by architects David Stirling and William Hay. The museum expanded its space in 1998 to include two floors of the Provincial Building, located just to the south of Dominion Building. The two structures are separated by Ondaatje Court, a public space that, besides being used for temporary exhibitions, contains several large permanent sculptures. Underneath the courtyard is a large underground exhibition room which connects the two buildings. During the gallery's expansion, work was done to accommodate the home of Maud Lewis into the museum building. Following that expansion, the museum complex covers 6,200 square metres (67,000 sq ft) of space, although only 19,500 square feet (1,810 m^{2}) of it is used as exhibition space.

In 1999, plans were announced by the Government of Nova Scotia to establish a satellite branch of the museum in southwestern Nova Scotia. On the 28 May 2006, the institution opened a satellite branch of the museum in Yarmouth, a municipality in southwest Nova Scotia. The satellite branch, branded as the Art Gallery of Nova Scotia Western Branch, provides additional exhibition space to exhibit works from the museum's permanent collection. The satellite branch building was housed in a former Royal Bank of Canada building built in 1913 and required renovations to expand its floor space by 900 square metres (9,700 sq ft). The western branch closed in January 2020, due to smoke damage, but reopened in July 2021.

In 2008, the museum published a report that recommended the construction of a new museum building, citing its present downtown building as "seriously inadequate." The museum's administration also noted that the building's lack of climate control and the region's weather have made it difficult to preserve works at the location.

In March 2018, a feasibility study was completed that recommended that the museum, along with the post-secondary art school NSCAD University, move to a new "cultural hub." However, plans for these joint facilities with the art school were later scrapped. The proposed building was located at Bishop's Landing, bounded by Lower Water Street, Salter Street, and the Halifax Boardwalk. The estimated cost to construct the building is C$130 million to C$140 million. The provincial government committed C$80 million, while the federal government committed C$30 million. The museum was tasked with raising C$30 million from public and private donors for the construction of the new building. Designs created by a KPMB Architects-led team were selected for the new building in November 2020. However, in 2022, the provincial government put the plans for the new building on hold due to the increasing costs associated with the project.

== Permanent collection ==
As of March 2019, the museum had over 18,000 works in its permanent collection. More than 2,000 Nova Scotian, Canadian, and non-Canadian artists are represented in the museum's permanent collection. Acquisitions for the museum's permanent collection are reviewed by the museum's Curatorial Committee, which includes curatorial and conservation staff, before being assessed by the museum's Director, Chief Curator, and the Curator of Collections. Further approval is then required from the museum's Acquisition Committee, made up of local artists, community members, and members of the museum's Board of Governors, before it is presented to the Board of Governors itself for final approval.

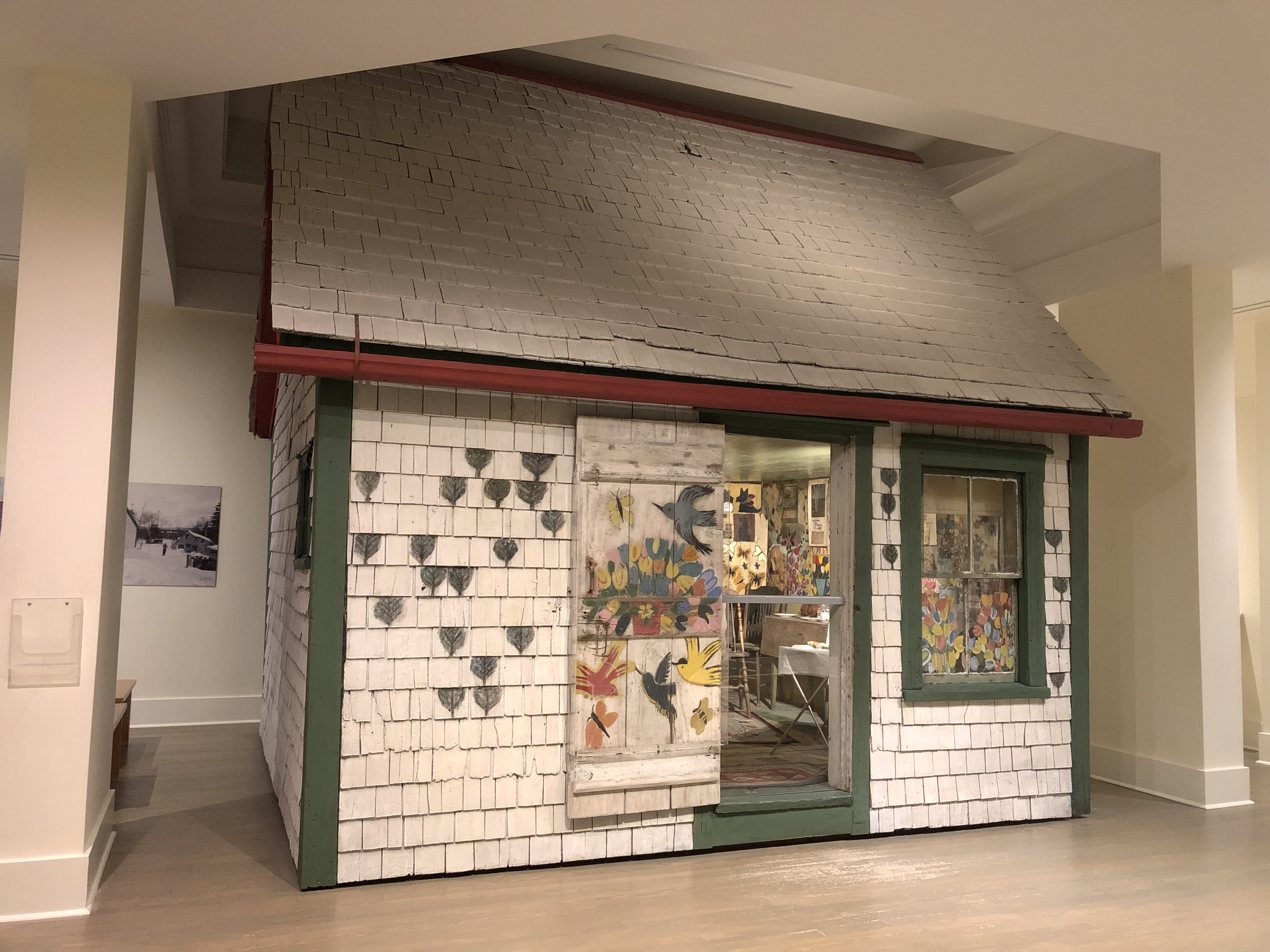
The restored Maud Lewis Home on display at the museum

As of June 2017, the museum had 55 works by Maud Lewis, making the museum's collection the world's largest public collection of works by her. The works are displayed in the gallery's Maud Lewis exhibit, which is the most visited exhibition space in the museum according to the institution. In addition to works by Lewis, the museum's collection also includes her house. Lewis's house was purchased by the Government of Nova Scotia after her death. In 1996, the museum took possession of the home, moving the small building into its Maud Lewis exhibit, along with some restoration work.

In June 2013, the museum acquired a collection of 2,070 images by photographer Annie Leibovitz. The Leibovitz collection was donated to the museum by the Mintz family, after they acquired it for C$4.7 million. It includes 1,307 editioned prints and 763 vintage file prints, with the earliest image dating to 1983. However, while the museum maintains ownership of the collection, its copyright is still held by the artist, pending a payment dispute between the donors, certification board, and artist.

The museum's collection also features works from a number of First Nations artists, including Kent Monkman. Miss Chief's Wet Dream, a 3.5 by 7 metres (11 by 23 ft) acrylic-on-canvas painting by Monkman, is among the largest works in the museum's permanent collection. It also includes a number of Nova Scotia artists such as Nancy Edell, Charlotte Lindgren and Carol Fraser.

=== Selected works ===
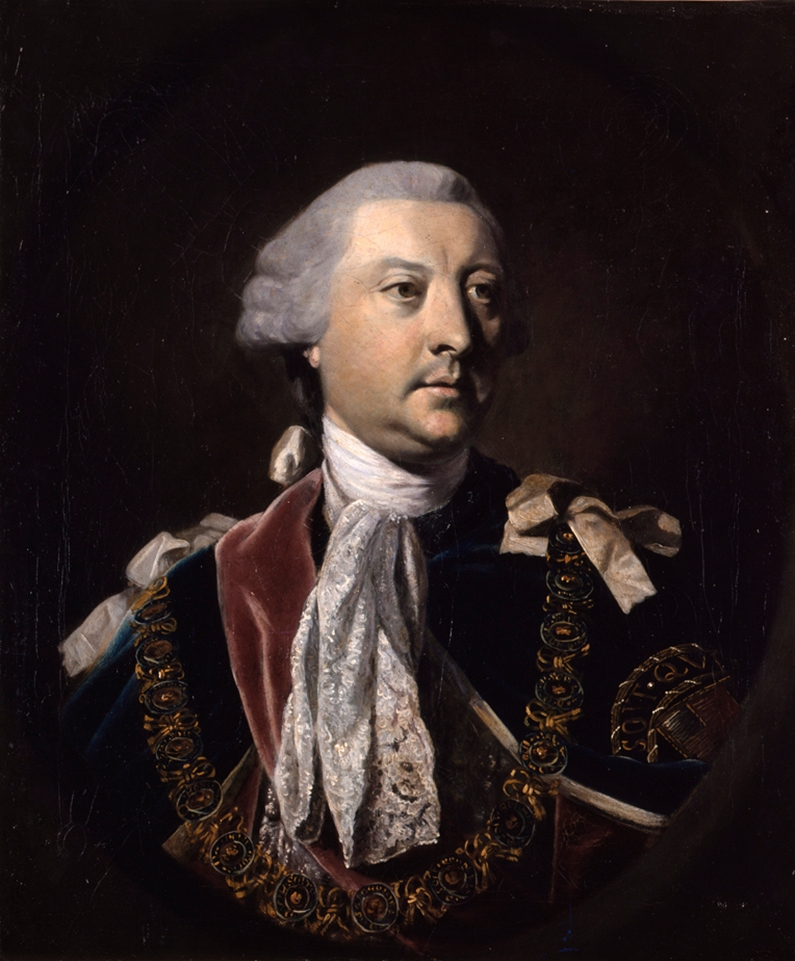
Joshua Reynolds, George Montagu-Dunk, 2nd Earl of Halifax, unknown

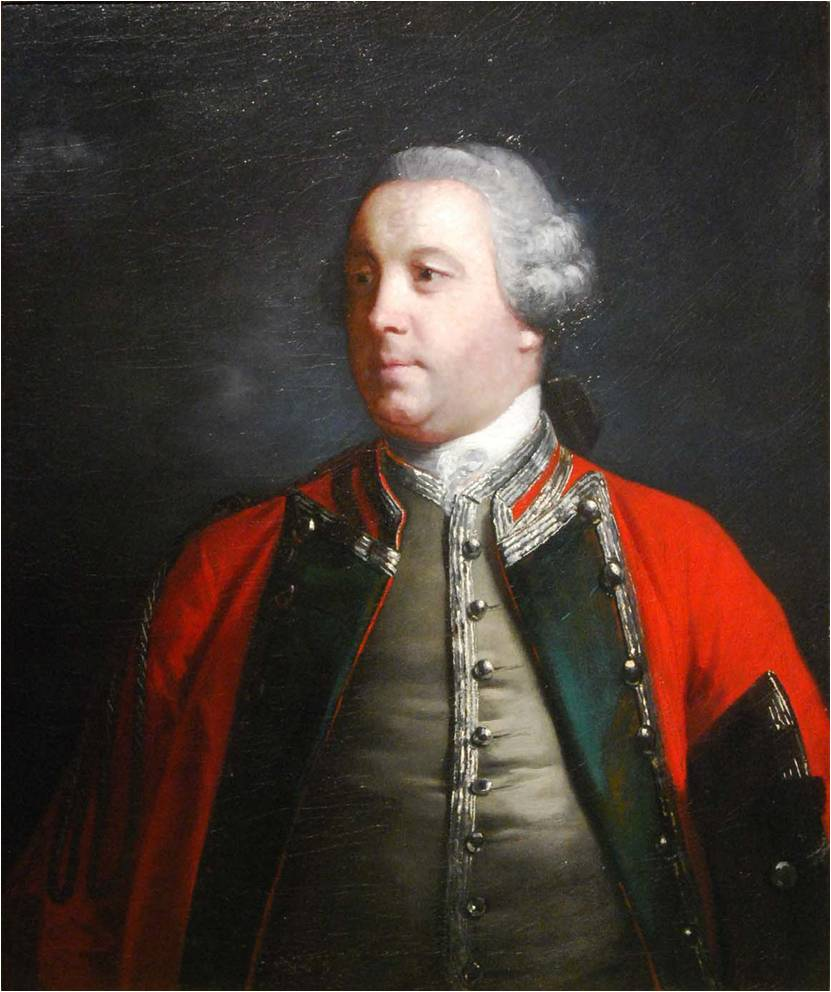
Joshua Reynolds, Edward Cornwallis, 1756

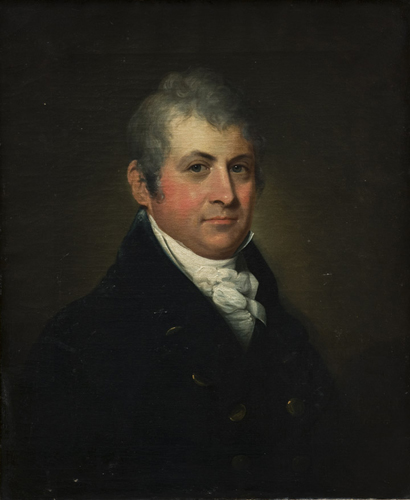
Robert Field, Andrew Belcher, 1808

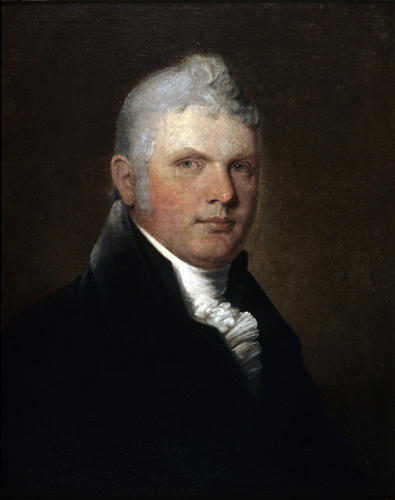
Robert Field, Edward Mortimer, 1815

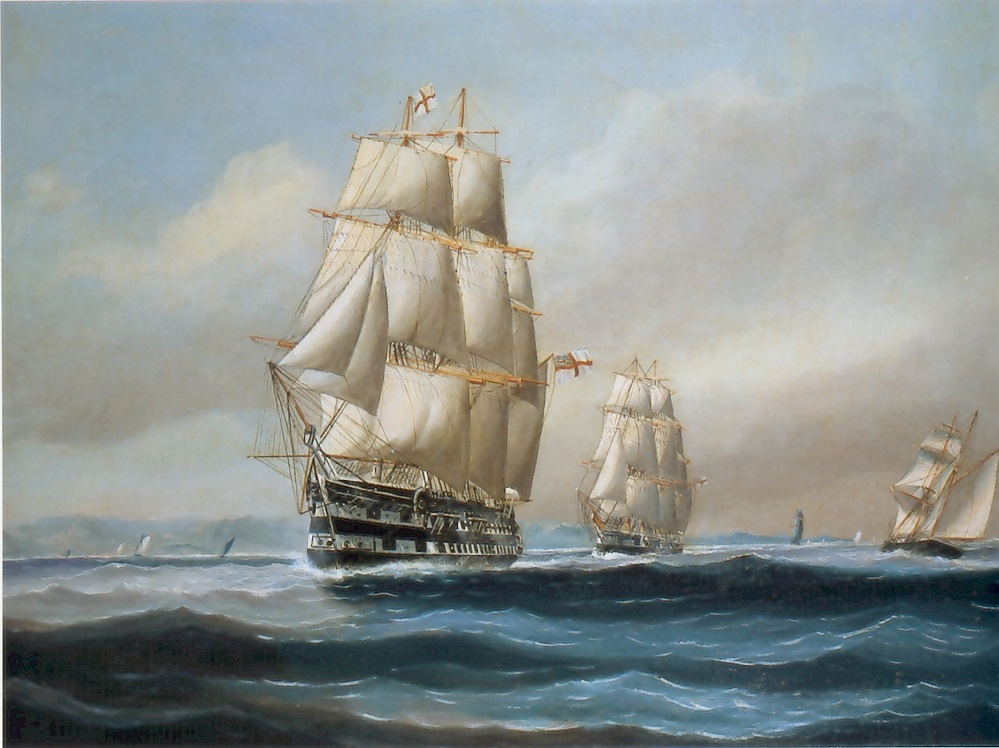
John O'Brien, Flagship Wellesley and Squadron Leaving Halifax Harbour, 1850

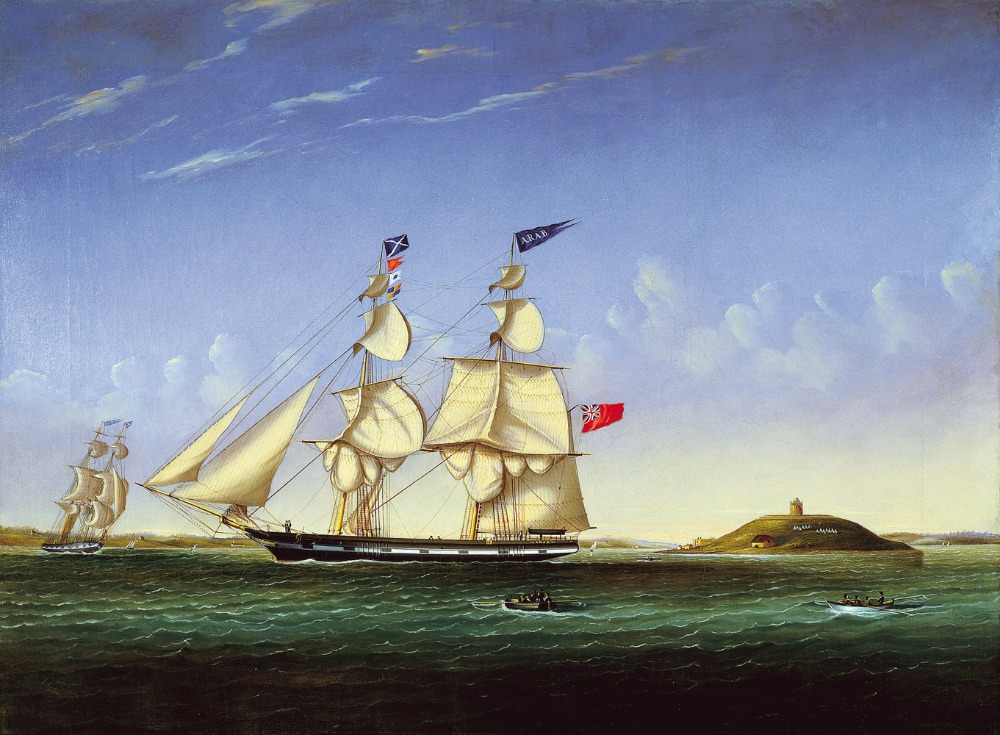
John O'Brien, The Arab, 1856

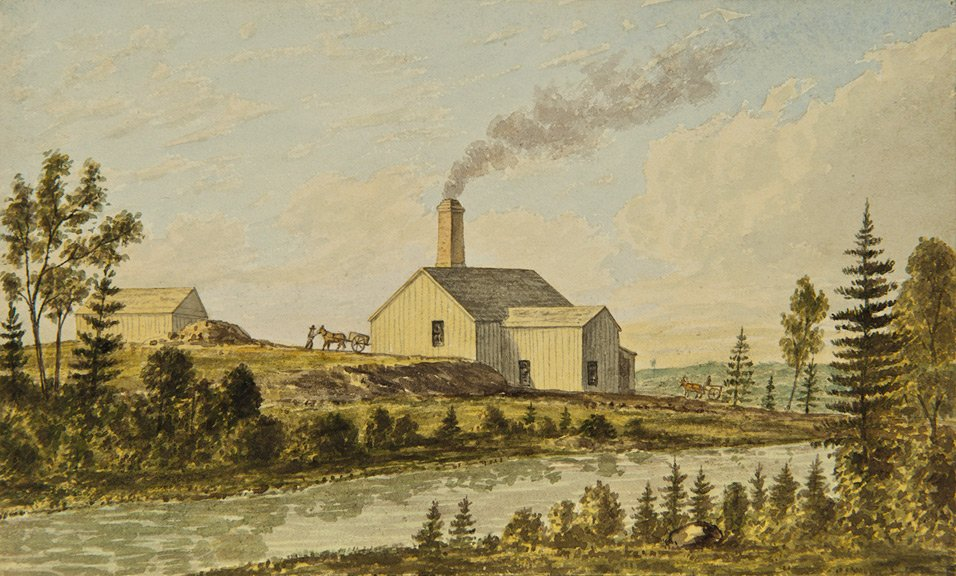
Frederick B. Nichols, Excelsior (late Chicago) Mill, Goldenville, 1871

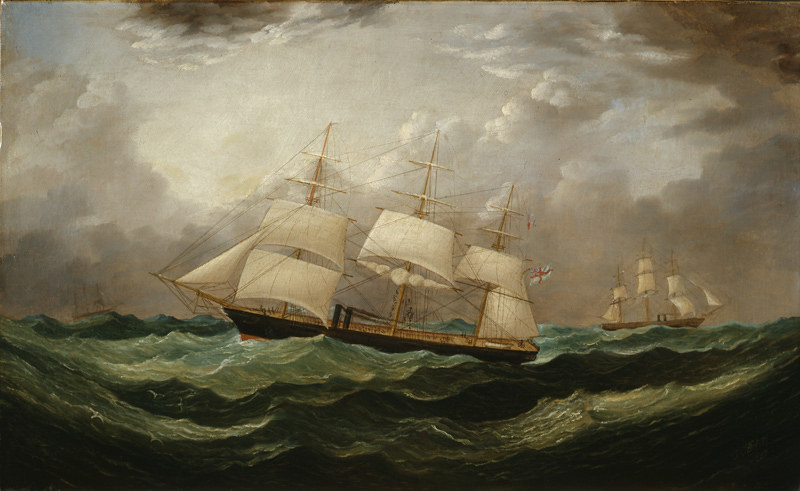
John O'Brien, HMS Galatea, in a Heavy Sea, 1888

== See also ==
- List of art museums
- List of museums in Nova Scotia
- List of oldest buildings and structures in Halifax, Nova Scotia
