= Charlotte Lindgren =

Canadian artist (1923–2023)

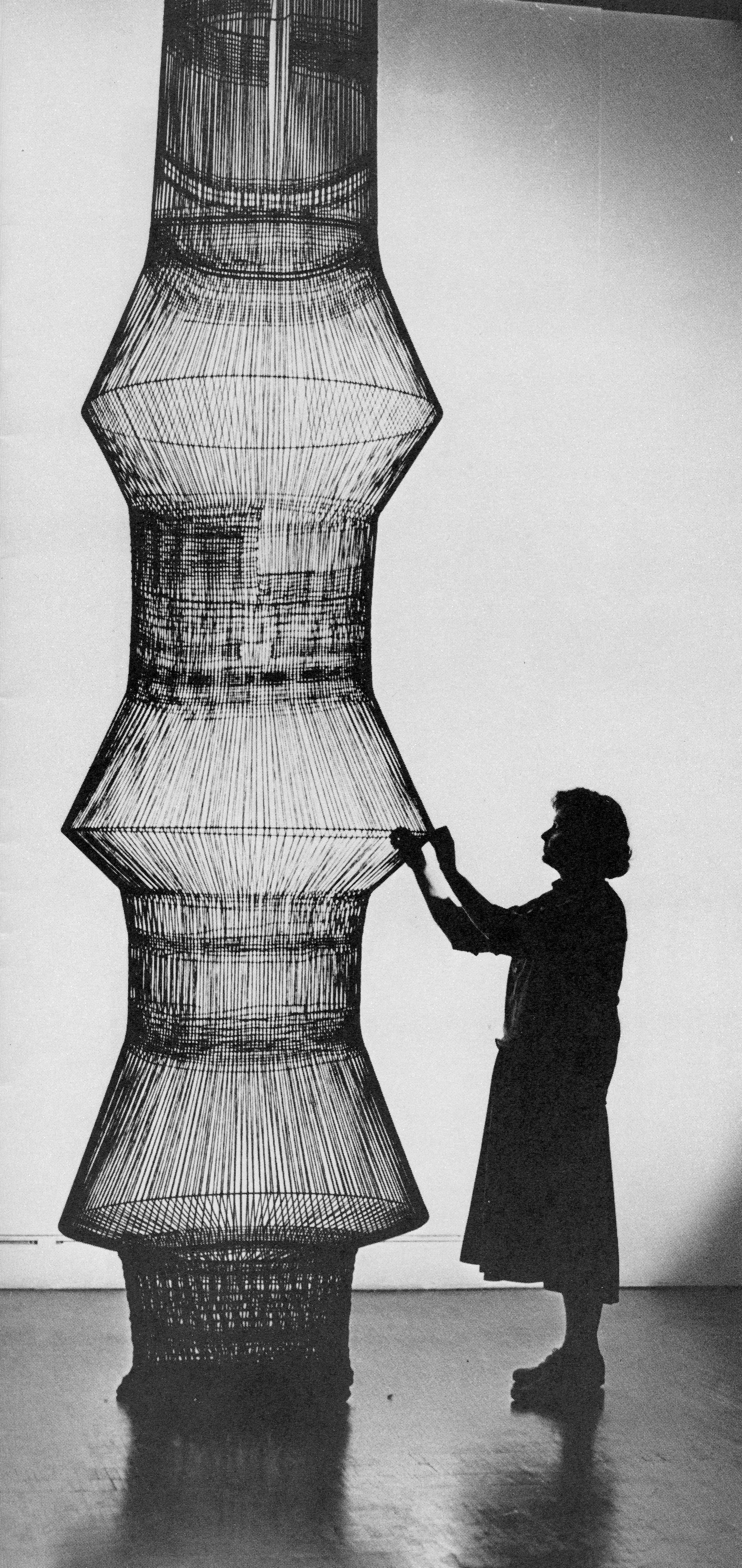
- Born: 1 February 1931; Toronto, Ontario, Canada
- Died: 19 April 2023 (aged 92); Cape Breton, Canada
- Education: University of Michigan, Haystack Mountain School of Crafts
- Known for: Innovative weaving
- Spouse: Ed Lindgren (m. 1952; div. 1991)

Charlotte Lindgren RCA (1 February 1931 – 19 April 2023) was a Canadian sculptor-weaver, installation artist, photographer and curator. Lindgren gained worldwide fame for innovative weaving due to the response to her distinctive installation Aedicule in the 1967 International Biennial of Tapestry in Lausanne, Switzerland. Her architectural textile works—usually large—are single woven planes that transform into three-dimensional forms. They explore the interplay between positive and negative spaces, allowing for dramatic shadows and movement.

Lindgren represented Canada abroad many times, and in 2002 was awarded the Queen Elizabeth II's Golden Jubilee Medal. She lived in Winnipeg from 1956 to 1963, then in 1964 moved to Halifax and afterwards to Cape Breton.

== Career ==
Lindgren was born in Toronto, Ontario, and received an undergraduate education and learned to weave at the University of Wisconsin, Michigan (B.Sc.) in the United States.

In 1952, she married Ed Lindgren. The couple lived in Toronto, Winnipeg, Halifax, and Fargo, North Dakota. They had two children, Eric and Jennifer. By assisting and sharing ideas with her husband, an architecture student and later practitioner and professor, Lindgren complemented her science background with a knowledge of architecture, a field that would strongly influence her art. In Winnipeg to which she moved in 1956, she got a part-time job as Design instructor at the University of Manitoba (1957–1963). In 1964, she won a scholarship to the Haystack Mountain School of Crafts in Deer Isle, Maine to work with Jack Lenor Larsen.

Larsen was so impressed by the originality of Lindgren's work that at the end of her time at Haystack, he lent her an 8-harness loom, and told her to go to her new home in Halifax and weave. She began to create her sculptural weaving work would take fine art weaving in a new direction, because of its three-dimensionality.

In 1965, she received a Canada Council Arts Scholarship to visit weavers in Finland, Sweden, and England. In 1978, she travelled to Pangnirtung, Baffin Island, as a Canada Council Visiting Artist. From 1978 to 1981, she served as Art Consultant to the Pangnirtung Tapestry Studio, where she encouraged new artists and introduced a numbered-edition system.

Lindgren also served as curator for the conceptual Knot Exhibition (1997) at Halifax's Mary E. Black Gallery. It invited viewer participation, and included the living knot garden of Peter Klynstra (1944–2010). She taught or gave guest lectures at many institutions, including the Ontario College of Art, the Nova Scotia College of Art and Design (now NSCAD University), the Banff Centre for the Arts, the University of Manitoba, the Philadelphia College of Art and, as a Fellow, at the Royal College of Art in London, England. She served on the executive of the Canadian Artists Representation (CARFAC) and as vice-president of the Royal Canadian Academy of Arts. She was a member of the Canada Council Arts Advisory Panel and juried Canada Council bursaries.

The Charlotte Lindgren fonds is in Library and Archives Canada.

== Work ==
Lindgren's work differs from traditional weaving in its use of materials and the way it approaches three-dimensional form. While a standard loom has four harnesses, Lindgren used one made to her own specifications — with 16 harnesses and two back tension beams. When weaving, her process involves testing what the possibilities could be when not as restricted by the traditional loom. Along with black wool chosen for its visual clarity, she might use monkey hair, and lead wire and plastic that reflected currents in 20th century modernism. In 1965, Carol Fraser wrote about the experimentation visible in each work by Lindgren.

A 1980 work, Windjammer (Robert McLaughlin Gallery, Oshawa) (linen, acrylic), took Lindgren in a new direction: it was her first work to be attached to a plastic sheet and cantilevered from the wall.

== Selected exhibitions ==
In 1965, her exhibitions included solo shows in New York City, at the Confederation Centre Art Gallery in Charlottetown, PEI, and at the University of Manitoba. In 1966, she exhibited at the Montreal Museum of Fine Arts, in Charlotte Lindgren: Woven Hangings held at the Winnipeg Art Gallery and in Threads of History, an American Federation of Arts exhibition that would tour major American galleries from 1966 to 1969. In 1967, her work Winter Tree (1965, Confederation Centre Art Gallery) (148 x 73 cm), a wire hanging composed of a complex single woven form with a tight circular base and a series of loose threads above, suggesting the branches of a tree, was featured in Expo 67's Canadian Fine Crafts exhibition. Her sculptural weavings were also displayed alongside other visual arts at the Art Gallery of Ontario's Perspectives 67 where she won a prize for her innovative approach to textiles. Also in 1967 her textile sculpture Aedicule (mohair, wool, synthetic, silk), which invited people to come in and be seated, inspired by a building - a kind of amphitheatre - she had seen in Otaniemi, Finland, designed by architect Alvar Aalto, attracted notice at the International Biennial of Tapestry in Lausanne, Switzerland.

In 1980, the Art Gallery of Nova Scotia held the exhibition Charlotte Lindgren: Fibre Structures that are now part of the Gallery's Permanent Collection. In 1989, the Art Gallery, Mount Saint Vincent University (MSVU) organized Charlotte Lindgren: Winter Wraps, curated by Elizabeth Jones, a photographic study of urban and winter gardens, especially the practice of tree wrapping in Japan, Canada and England. In 1998, Ingrid Jenkner for the MSVU Gallery curated the exhibition Charlotte Lindgren: Winter Gardens, 30 of Lindgren's colour photographs resulting from a 1995-96 train journey, during which she photographed private and public gardens at each stop and, in 2014, the MSVU Gallery included her work in Big in Nova Scotia.

In 2022, she was included in the major travelling show Prairie Interlace, organized by Nickle Galleries in Calgary and the MacKenzie Art Gallery, Regina.

== Selected public collections ==
Her work is in the collections of such galleries and institutions as the Art Gallery of Nova Scotia; Confederation Centre Art Gallery; the Robert McLaughlin Gallery; Winnipeg Art Gallery; and the Canada Council Art Bank, among other distinguished collections such as that of the Assn. Pierre Pauli, Switzerland.

== Commissions ==
Among Lindgren's most notable works in the 1970s were two commissioned pieces — a metalized plastic sculpture for the Canadian Pavilion at Expo 70 in Osaka, Japan; and a cylinder (wool, steel) for the Canadian Broadcasting Company building in Montreal. The latter — one of several large black cylinders in Lindgren's oeuvre — is 30 feet long with a four-foot diameter, and can be viewed from three storeys.

== Awards and honours ==
- Critic's Choice award at Visua 66, at Montreal Museum of Fine Arts, 1966;
- Child, a wall hanging of a young girl with golden braids, shown at the Art Gallery of Ontario, won first prize in Fine Crafts at Perspective 67, an exhibit that showcased the winners of Canada's Centennial Year national competition, 1967;
- prize in Canada Crafts '67 Competition;
- Member, Royal Canadian Academy of Arts and served as its vice-president (1978–1986);
- Fellow, at the Royal College of Art in London, England (1983);
- Queen Elizabeth II Golden Jubilee Medal, 2002.

== Community activism ==
In 1983, Lindgren led protests against the construction of proposed high rises around Halifax's authentic Victorian public garden, which resulted in height limitations and setback requirements and the founding of The Friends of the Public Gardens.
