= John Fraser (critic) =

British scholar and critic (1928–2023)

John Fraser (18 July 1928 – 11 September 2023) was a British academic, writer and art critic. He spent much of his career in the United States and at Dalhousie University in Canada. He wrote three printed books and many other works published in digital form, and publicised the work of his late wife, the American artist Carol Hoorn Fraser.

== Biography ==
Born in North London on 18 July 1928, and educated at a provincial grammar school, John Fraser entered Balliol College, Oxford, in 1948 as an Exhibitioner (junior scholar) and read English. In 1953 he moved to the States, taking the Barzun-Trilling and doing a Ph.D. at the University of Minnesota, with a dissertation on George Sturt, rural labouring life, and the rhetoric of sociological presentation, plus a minor in Philosophy, including classes from Wilfred Sellars and Alan Donagan.

In 1961, he and the Minnesota artist Carol Hoorn Fraser moved to Halifax, Nova Scotia, where he taught at Dalhousie University, retiring in 1993 as George Munro Professor of English.

During his academic career he published three books with Cambridge University Press, and numerous articles. In 1990 he gave the Alexander Lectures at the University of Toronto, on Nihilism, Modernism, and Value. He is an elected Fellow of the Royal Society of Canada.

After Carol's death in 1991 he co-curated a show of her work, A Visionary Gaze (1993), and engaged in extensive archival work on her art and life. His website, Jottings.ca, was conceived as a vehicle for extending her reputation. It rapidly branched out, and now includes the equivalent of several print books.

A reviewer of his Violence in the Arts (1973) spoke of Fraser’s "extremely agile and incessantly active mind which illuminates almost every subject it touches." Another called his magnum opus, America and the Patterns of Chivalry (1983), "a brilliant and utterly absorbing work" and said that "There are not many learned books which have the unputdownable quality of a thriller; this is one of them."

The series in which his The Name of Action; Critical Essays (1984) appeared was "established to publish in paperback for an individual readership the Press’s most outstanding monographs."

Fraser died on 11 September 2023, at the age of 95.

== Published works ==
=== Print books ===
- Violence in the Arts (Cambridge, CUP, 1974); illustrated pb 1976 ISBN 0-521-20331-7 hc /ISBN 0 521 29029 5 pb
- America and the Patterns of Chivalry (Cambridge, CUP, 1982) ISBN 0-521-24183-9
- The Name of Action: Critical Essays (Cambridge, CUP, 1984) ISBN 0-521-27745-0 pb [Shakespeare, Scott Fitzgerald, Twain, Emily Brontë, Stephen Crane, B. Traven, Pauline Réage, Yvor Winters, Northrop Frye, Swift, J.L. and Barbara Hammond, George Sturt, Eugène Atget, the organic community].

=== E-books ===
- Nihilism, Modernism, and Value (Published in eBook format by eBookIt.com, 2013) ISBN 978-1-4566-1291-7
- A Bit of This and a Bit of That about Poetry (Published in eBook format by eBookIt.com, 2013) ISBN 978-1-4566-1900-8
- Thrillers (Published in eBook format by eBookIt.com, 2014) ISBN 978-1-4566-2212-1
- Desires; Sixty-Five French Poems plus a Small but Famous German One, translated by John Fraser (Published in eBook format by eBookIt.com, 2014) ISBN 978-1-4566-2214-5
- Pushing Back: Language, Truth, and Consequences (Published in eBook format by eBookIt.com, 2015) ISBN 978-1-4566-2495-8
- Focusing: Drawings by Carol Fraser, edited by John Fraser and Barbara Bickle (Published in eBook format by eBookIt.com, 2015) ISBN 978-1-4566-1291-7
- Moments: 100 photographs by John Fraser (Published in eBook format by eBookIt.com, 2015) ISBN 978-1-4566-2563-4
- Gardens of Delight and Power: Images by Carol Hoorn Fraser, edited by John Fraser and Barbara Bickle (Published in eBook format by eBookIt.com, 2015) ISBN 978-1-4566-2490-3
- Dwellings: Watercolours by Carol Hoorn Fraser, edited by Barbara Bickle and John Fraser (Published in eBook format by eBookIt.com, 2015) ISBN 978-1-4566-2492-7
- Interfacing: 22 photographs by John Fraser (Published in eBook format by eBookIt.com, 2016) ISBN 978-1-4566-2750-8
- Camera Work (revised edition): 35 Photographs by John Fraser (Published in eBook format by eBookIt.com, 2017) ISBN 978-1-4566-2754-6

=== Web-books ===
(All are located at www.jottings.ca. Sections of each book are listed in square brackets after the title and date.)

- Carol Hoorn Fraser (2001)
- Nihilism, Modernism, and Value (1990/2001) [Substantiality / Cold White Peaks / Being There Together] Alexander Lectures
- Language, Truth, and Consequences (2001) [In Defence of Language / Playing for Real: Discourse and Authority / Communication, Communion, Communality / Mind-Forged Manacles]
- Thrillers (2002) [The Best Thriller / A Philosophical Thriller / Writer at Work / Quickies / Reading Thrillers / Back-Ups]
- Voices in the Cave of Being (2004) [Preliminary / Poetry and the Headmaster’s Wife / Among the Monuments / Powers of Style / Personals / A New Book of Verse / Language and Being / Other Rooms / Resources]
- A New Book of Verse [eleven-hundred English, French, and German poems from Chaucer until now]
- Found Pages; the Remarkable Harold Ernest Kelly (2006) [Introductory / BioBiblio / Violence, Inc. / Sidebars / Notes / Concluding / Supplementary / Backgrounds]

=== Selected articles ===
==== Criticism ====
- "Swift and the Decay of Letters", (1955) Jottings>Beginnings
- "The Name of Action: Nelly Dean and Wuthering Heights," Nineteenth Century Fiction, 20 (1965); in The Name of Action (NA)
- "A Dangerous Book?—The Story of O," Western Humanities Review, 20 (1966); (NA)
- "In Defence of Culture: Huckleberry Finn," Oxford Review (1967) (NA); tweaked and reformatted as “‘Civilization’ and Romance in Huckleberry Finn” (2008); Jottings>America and the Chivalric.
- "Atget and the City," Cambridge Quarterly, 3 (1968), Studio International (1971); Pnina R. Petruck, ed., The Camera Viewed: Writings on Twentieth-Century Photography (1979) [condensed]; (NA)
- "Prospero’s Book: The Tempest Revisited," [secularity, power, and justice] Critical Review (1968); (NA)
- "Photography and the City," Yale Review, 59 (1970)
- "Rereading Traven’s The Death Shio," Southern Review, 9 (1973); (NA)
- "Heroic Order in the Poetry of J.V. Cunningham," Southern Review, 23 (1987)
- "Crane, Norris, and London," American Literature, vol.9 of New Pelican Guide to English Literature, ed Boris Ford (Harmondsworth, Penguin, 1988)
- "Borges and the Chivalric," Selected Papers in Medievalism; Volumes I and II, 1986 and 1987, ed. Janet E. Goebel and Rebecca Cochran, Indiana PA, Indiana U of Pennsylvania, 1988
- "Jorge Luis Borges, Alive in His Labyrinth," Criticism, 31 (1989)
- "Portals and Pulps: Orwell, Hoggart, 'America,' and the Uses of Gangster Fiction," Transatlantica; revue d' études Américaines, (2012) [online]

==== Principles ====
- "Modern Poetics: Twentieth-Century American and British", Encyclopedia of Poetry and Poetics, ed. Alex Preminger (Princeton NJ, Princeton UP, 1964)
- "Northrop Frye and Evaluation," Cambridge Quarterly, 11 (1967); (NA)
- "The Erotic and Censorship," Oxford Review (1968)
- "Winters’ Summa," (review-article on Yvor Winters’ Forms of Discovery), Southern Review, 7 (1969)
- "Leavis and Winters: Professional Manners," Cambridge Quarterly, 5 (1970)
- "Yvor Winters: the Perils of Mind," Centennial Review, 14 (1970); (NA)
- "Stretches and Languages; a Contribution to Critical Theory," College English, 32 (1971)
- "Evaluation and English Studies," College English, 35 (1973)
- "Playing for Real; Discourse and Authority," University of Toronto Quarterly, 56 (1987); Jottings>Language, Truth, and Consequences
- "Mind-Forged Manacles; Reply to a Questionnaire," University of Toronto Quarterly, 58 (1990); Jottings>Language, Truth, and Consequences
- “Vision and Analogy” (2003) Jottings>Voices>Other Rooms
- “Referentiality and Stanley Fish” (2004); Jottings>Saying Simply

==== Philosophical ====
- “Descartes’ Discourse on Method; a Look at Its Rhetoric,” GSE (Graduate Student of English), 2 (1959); Jottings>Beginnings
- "In Defense of Language; If It Needs It," University of Toronto Quarterly, 59 (1989); Jottings>Language, Truth, and Consequences
- “A Philosophical Thriller: Charles Williams’ Dead Calm” (2002) Jottings>Thrillers
- “Winters, Leavis, and Language” (2003); Jottings>Voices>Other Rooms
- “Snooker, Pool, and Determinism” (2005); Jottings>Cogitations
- “Poetry and Knowledge—again…and again…and again” (2006); Jottings>Cogitations

==== Other ====
- "Reflections on the Organic Community," Human World (1974); (NA)
- "Watching Horror Movies," University of Michigan Quarterly (1990) 29: 39-54.
- “America, Truth, and Honor” (chapter 11 and amplified notes, plus excerpts, from America and the Patterns of Chivalry) (2008); Jottings>America and the Chivalric
- “The Educated Imagination: Carol Hoorn Fraser, Artist” (2008); Jottings>Cogitations

=== Miscellaneous ===
- Co-editor at the University of Minnesota, with Thomas J. Roberts and others, of GSE: The Graduate Student of English: a Quarterly Journal, 12 issues (1957–60)
- With Leighton Davis, A Visionary Gaze: In Memoriam Carol Hoorn Fraser 1930-1991 (Halifax, NS, Saint Mary’s University Art Gallery, 1993), exhibition catalogue, ISBN 978-1-895763-12-6
- Moments: Photographs 1957–66, 1995–99 (2004); Jottings>Visuals
