= Nova Scotia Department of Communities, Culture, Tourism and Heritage =

Department of Nova Scotian Government

Coat of arms of Nova Scotia

The Department of Communities, Culture, Tourism and Heritage is a department of the Government of Nova Scotia that promotes arts, culture, and local heritage within the province. The department oversees three main cultural affairs groups: Acadian Affairs, African Nova Scotian Affairs, and Gaelic Affairs. They also oversee Nova Scotia Archives, Nova Scotia Museum, and Nova Scotia Provincial Library, which work with and oversee the province's archives, museums, and libraries respectively. They also oversee Tourism Nova Scotia, which promotes the province's tourism industry.

Approximately 395 people work for the Department of Communities, Culture, Tourism, and Heritage, including both seasonal and year-round staff.

== Responsibilities ==
The Department of Communities, Culture, Tourism, and Heritage is responsible for various activities and tasks, which include:

- “contributing to the creative and cultural wellbeing of communities;”
- funding art, culture, and recreation programs;
- working with the department's partners and communities concerning “services, programs and policies;”
- overseeing heritage and cultural affairs groups;
- overseeing Nova Scotia Archives, Nova Scotia Museum, and Nova Scotia Provincial Library;
- “preserving and providing access to Nova Scotia's culture, heritage, identity and languages,” particularly French, Gaelic, and Mi’kmaw; and
- “developing a long-term strategy for sustainable tourism in the province.”

== History ==
What now constitutes as the modern Department of Communities, Culture, Tourism, and Heritage started in 1987 with the dissolution of the Department of Culture, Recreation, and Fitness. The responsibilities surrounding cultural activities was regulated to the tourism department. The 1987 restructuring created the Department of Tourism and Culture.

The Department of Tourism and Culture was again dissolved in 1994. Tourism responsibilities were transferred to the Department of Economic Development, responsibilities concerning parks and recreation transferred to the Department of Natural Resources, and cultural responsibilities transferred to the Department of Education.

The Department of Tourism and Culture returned in 1999, and was responsible for tourism development and planning, culture-related activities like preserving natural and documented objects, and the operation of Nova Scotia Museum and Archives and Records Management. The department's name was changed to the Department of Tourism, Culture, and Heritage to better reflect their changing role.

In January 2011, tourism responsibilities were transferred to the Department of Economic and Rural Development, which then changed its name to Economic and Rural Development and Tourism. With this restructuring, the Department of Tourism, Culture, and Heritage renamed itself to Communities, Culture, and Heritage and took over responsibility for the Provincial Library (from the Department of Education). They also took responsibility for Acadian Affairs, African Nova Scotian Affairs, and Gaelic Affairs at that time.

The Department of Communities, Culture, and Heritage took over responsibilities pertaining to “volunteerism and the non-profit sector from the Department of Labour and Advanced Education in November 2014. The Department also took over responsibility for the “regional economic development plan, Nova Scotia Community Access Program and funding for Le Conseil de developpement economique de la Nouvelle Écosse from the former Department of Economic and Rural Development and Tourism.”

Tourism Nova Scotia fully transitioned to being a division of the Department of Communities, Culture, Tourism and Heritage in January 2022.

== Leadership ==
Note: The name of the Department of Communities, Culture, Tourism and Heritage has changed over the years. This list includes ministers that have headed the department under its current name, as well as its previous names such as the Department of Tourism and Culture.

See: list of premiers of Nova Scotia

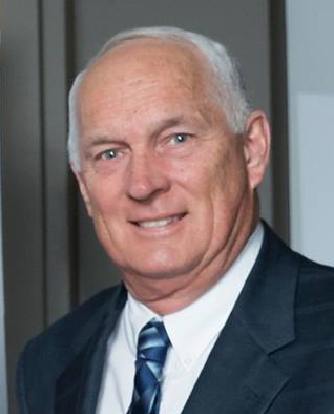
Hon. Pat Dunn

- 2021–present, Pat Dunn, PC
- 2020–2021, Suzanne Lohnes-Croft, Liberal
- 2017–2020, Leo A. Glavine, Liberal
- 2013–2017, Tony Ince, Liberal
- 2011–2012, Dave Wilson, NDP
- 2009–2011, Percy Paris, NDP
- 2007–2009, Bill Dooks, PC
- 2006–2007, Leonard Goucher, PC
- 2006-2006, Judy Streatch, PC
- 1999–2006, Rodney MacDonald, PC
- 1993–1994, David Ross Bragg, Liberal
- 1992–1993, John Gregory Kerr, PC
- 1991–1992, Terence Richard Boyd Donahoe, PC
- 1989–1991, Roland John Thornhill, PC
- 1987–1989, Brian Alexander Young, PC

== Partners ==
Organizations that work with the Department of Communities, Culture, Tourism, and Heritage include:

- Advisory Board of the Public Archives
- Arts Nova Scotia
- Community Sector Council of Nova Scotia
- Creative Nova Scotia Leadership Council
- Gaelic Council of Nova Scotia
- La Fédération acadienne de la Nouvelle-Écosse
- Nova Scotia Museum Board of Governors
- Nova Scotia Provincial Library
- Recreation Facility Association of Nova Scotia
- Recreation Nova Scotia
- Sport Nova Scotia
