= Premier of Nova Scotia =

Head of government of Nova Scotia

- Premier ministre de la Nouvelle-Écosse; Prìomhaire Alba Nuadh
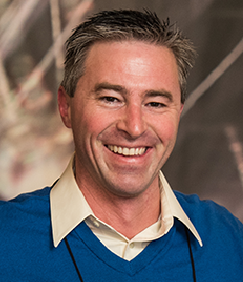
- Incumbent; Tim Houston since August 31, 2021
- Office of the Premier
- Style: The Honourable (formal); Premier (informal)
- Status: Head of Government
- Member of: Legislative Assembly; Executive Council
- Reports to: Legislative Assembly; Lieutenant Governor
- Seat: Halifax
- Appointer: Lieutenant Governor of Nova Scotia with the confidence of the Nova Scotia Legislature
- Term length: At His Majesty's pleasure contingent on the premier's ability to command confidence in the legislative assembly
- Formation: July 4, 1867
- First holder: Hiram Blanchard
- Deputy: Deputy premier of Nova Scotia
- Salary: $89,234.90 plus $112,791.20 (indemnity and allowances)
- Website: Premier Official Website

The premier of Nova Scotia is the first minister to the lieutenant governor of the Canadian province of Nova Scotia and presides over the Executive Council of Nova Scotia. Following the Westminster system, the premier is normally the leader of the political party which has the most seats in the Nova Scotia House of Assembly who is called upon by the lieutenant governor to form a government. As the province's head of government, the premier exercises considerable power.

The current premier of Nova Scotia is Tim Houston, who was sworn in on August 31, 2021. His party, the Progressive Conservative Association of Nova Scotia, was elected in August 2021.

== Responsibilities ==
The premier serves as president of the Executive Council (Cabinet). They choose the other members of the Cabinet, who are then appointed by the lieutenant governor. As president of the Executive Council, the premier forms the government. They lead the Executive Council’s decision-making process as the Council develops and implements the government's priorities and policies. The premier establishes the Executive Council’s methods of operation and organization and that of its committees.

== See also ==
- List of premiers of Nova Scotia
- Politics of Nova Scotia
- Government of Nova Scotia
