= Politics of Nova Scotia =

Politics of Canadian province

- Coat of arms of Nova Scotia
- Polity type: Province within a federal parliamentary constitutional monarchy
- Constitution: Constitution of Canada

Legislative branch
- Name: General Assembly: House of Assembly
- Type: Unicameral
- Meeting place: Province House, Halifax
- Presiding officer: Speaker of the House of Assembly

Executive branch
- Head of state
- Currently: King Charles III represented by Michael Savage, Lieutenant Governor
- Head of government
- Currently: Premier; Tim Houston
- Appointer: Lieutenant Governor
- Cabinet
- Name: Executive Council
- Leader: Premier (as President of the Executive Council)
- Appointer: Lieutenant Governor
- Headquarters: Halifax

Judicial branch
- Court of Appeal
- Chief judge: Michael Wood
- Seat: Law Courts, Halifax

The politics of the Canadian province of Nova Scotia take place within the framework of a Westminster-style parliamentary constitutional monarchy. As Canada's head of state and monarch, Charles III is the sovereign of the province in his capacity as King in Right of Nova Scotia; his duties in Nova Scotia are carried out by the Lieutenant Governor, Michael Savage. The General Assembly is the legislature, consisting of the Lieutenant Governor and fifty-five members representing their electoral districts in the House of Assembly. The Government is headed by the Premier, Tim Houston, who took office on August 31, 2021. The capital city is Halifax, home to the Lieutenant Governor, the House of Assembly, and the Government. The House of Assembly has met in Halifax at Province House since 1819.

== Monarchy ==
The role of the Crown is both legal and practical; it functions in Nova Scotia in the same way it does in all of Canada's other provinces, being the centre of a constitutional construct in which the institutions of government acting under the sovereign's authority share the power of the whole. It is thus the foundation of the executive, legislative, and judicial branches of the province. The Canadian monarch—since 8 September 2022, King Charles III—is represented and his duties carried out by the lieutenant governor of Nova Scotia, whose direct participation in governance is limited by the conventional stipulations of constitutional monarchy, with most related powers entrusted for exercise by the elected parliamentarians, the ministers of the Crown generally drawn from among them, and the judges and justices of the peace.

== Legislative power ==
The Nova Scotia House of Assembly, (Note: French: Assemblée législative de la Nouvelle-Écosse; Scottish Gaelic: Taigh Seanaidh Alba Nuadh) or Legislative Assembly, is the sole chamber of the unicameral General Assembly of Nova Scotia. The assembly is the oldest in Canada, having first sat in 1758; in 1848, it was the site of the first responsible government in the British Empire. Bills passed by the House of Assembly are given royal assent by the Lieutenant Governor of Nova Scotia in the name of the King in Right of Nova Scotia.

When established in 1758, the General Assembly consisted of the Crown represented by the Governor (Lieutenant Governor post-confederation), the appointed Nova Scotia Council holding both executive and legislative duties and the elected House of Assembly (lower chamber). In 1838, the Council was replaced by an executive council with the executive function and a legislative council with the legislative functions based on the House of Lords. In 1928, the Legislative Council was abolished and the members pensioned off, resulting in a unicameral legislature with the House of Assembly as the sole chamber.

There are 56 members of the legislative assembly (MLAs) representing 56 electoral districts. Members nearly always represent one of the three main political parties of the province: the Nova Scotia Liberal Party, the Progressive Conservative Association of Nova Scotia, and Nova Scotia New Democratic Party.

== Executive power ==
The Government of Nova Scotia exercises the executive power. The chief body of the Government is the Executive Council, also known as Cabinet. The Premier of Nova Scotia is President of the Executive Council.

== Electoral history ==
=== 1867 to 1916 ===
Elections to the Legislative Assembly of Nova Scotia (1867–1916) – seats won by party
Government	Anti Confederation	Liberal		Con	Liberal								
Party	1867	1871	1874	1878	1882	1886	1890	1897	1897	1901	1906	1911	1916
Liberal	36	24	22	6	24	28	29	25	34	36	32	26	31
Conservative	2	14	12	32	14	10	9	13	3	2	4	12	12
Independent			4						1		2		
Total	38	38	38	38	38	37	38	37	38	38	38	38	43

=== 1920 to 1967 ===
Elections to the Legislative Assembly of Nova Scotia (1920–1967) – seats won by party
Government	Liberal	Con		Liberal						PC			
Party	1920	1925	1928	1933	1937	1941	1945	1949	1953	1956	1960	1963	1967
Liberal	29	3	18	22	25	22	28	27	22	18	15	4	6
Conservative	3	40	24	8	5	5							
Progressive Conservative								8	13	24	27	39	40
United Farmers	6												
Labour	5		1										
Cooperative Commonwealth Federation						3	2	2	2	1	1		
Total	43	43	43	30	30	30	30	37	37	43	43	43	46

=== 1970 to present ===
Elections to the Legislative Assembly of Nova Scotia (1970–present) – seats won by party
Government	Liberal		PC				Liberal		PC			NDP	Liberal		PC	
Party	1970	1974	1978	1981	1984	1988	1993	1998	1999	2003	2006	2009	2013	2017	2021	2024
Liberal	23	31	17	13	6	21	40	19	11	12	9	11	33	27	17	2
Progressive Conservative	21	12	31	37	42	28	9	14	30	25	23	10	11	17	31	43
New Democratic	2	3	4	1	3	2	3	19	11	15	20	31	7	7	6	9
Cape Breton Labour				1	1	1										
Independent															1	1
Total	46	46	52	52	52	52	52	52	52	52	52	52	51	51	55	55

Of the registered voters in 2017, 53.4% voted. Voter turnout has decreased from 82% turnout in 1960.

=== Federal elections from 1968 to 2021 ===
Elections to the Parliament of Canada from Nova Scotia (1968–2021) — seats won by party
Party	1968	1972	1974	1979	1980	1984	1988	1993	1997	2000	2004	2006	2008	2011	2015	2019	2021
Liberal	1	1	2	2	6	2	6	11		4	6	6	5	4	11	10	8
PC	10	10	8	8	5	9	5		6	4							
NDP			1	1					6	3	2	2	2	3			
Reform / Alliance																	
Conservative											3	3	3	4		1	3
Total	11	11	11	11	11	11	11	11	11	11	11	11	11	11	11	11	11

== See also ==
- Lieutenant Governor of Nova Scotia
- Premier of Nova Scotia
- Government of Nova Scotia
- Politics of Canada
- Political culture of Canada
