= Judy Dietz =

Canadian curator and historian

Judy Dietz is a Canadian curator and historian.

== Early life ==
Judith E. Dietz is the daughter of the late Robert Dietz, the first director and curator of the Saint Mary's University Art Gallery. She received her B.A. (1984) and M.A. (2007) from Saint Mary's University in Halifax.

== Career ==
She began to work at the Nova Scotia Museum of Fine Arts in 1973, now known as the Art Gallery of Nova Scotia. She became the Art Gallery of Nova Scotia's first Registrar and the Manager of Collections and Gallery Services and oversaw the growth of the collection from 300 to 12,000 artworks as well as curating numerous exhibitions and writing articles. She retired from this job in 2005 but continued her affiliation with the Art Gallery of Nova Scotia as Associate Curator of Historical European Art.

In 1999, Dietz discovered a book in Saint Mary's University Patrick Power Library's rare book collection, catalogued as a "Roman Catholic Antiphonary." In 2002, she identified the book as the Salzinnes Antiphonal, a large hand-scribed illuminated choir book dated 1554 and 1555, originating from the Cistercian Abbey of Salzinnes on the outskirts of Namur, Belgium and wrote her Master's Thesis about it. The Antiphonal was discovered to have been commissioned for Dame Julienne de Glymes and it contains Latin liturgical texts and plainchant music for the Divine Office, alongside rare, possibly unique full-page illuminations depicting named female monastics.

After its discovery, extensive conservation, and scholarly interpretation, the Antiphonal became the subject of the major exhibition at the Art Gallery of Nova Scotia An Expression of Faith : sacred acts of centuries past in 1998, shown again in 2007. The exhibition received international attention.

Dietz continued to do exhibitions on different subjects. In 2013, Dietz curated the exhibition Show of Hands about self-taught artists in Nova Scotia. She also continued to research, lecture and publish work on the Antiphonal. It was featured as a central document in the Atlantic Mediæval Association's conference in 2017.

== Honors ==
In 2017, Dietz received an honorary degree from Saint Mary's University. That year also culminated in the publication and the exhibition, Centuries of Silence: The Discovery of the Salzinnes Antiphonal at the Art Gallery of Nova Scotia which traveled to Namur, Belgium in 2020. The book/catalogue which accompanied the exhibition was authored by Dietz and published by Goose Lane Editions based in Fredericton, New Brunswick.
