= Government of Nova Scotia =

Canadian provincial government

- Provincial government

Overview
- Established: 1758
- Country: Canada
- Polity: Province
- Leader: Premier; Tim Houston
- Appointed by: Lieutenant Governor; Michael Savage
- Main organ: Cabinet
- Responsible to: House of Assembly
- Headquarters: Halifax
- Website: www.novascotia.ca

The Government of Nova Scotia (Note: French: Gouvernement de la Nouvelle-Écosse, Scottish Gaelic: Riaghaltas Alba Nuadh) is the government of the Canadian province of Nova Scotia. The powers and structure of the province are set out in the Constitution Act, 1867. In modern Canadian use, the term "government" refers broadly to the cabinet of the day (formally the Executive Council of Nova Scotia) chosen from the Nova Scotia House of Assembly and the non-political staff within each provincial department or agency – that is, the civil service.

Nova Scotia has a unicameral legislature, the General Assembly, whose sole chamber is the House of Assembly. In total, 56 representatives are elected to serve the interests of the province. The political party that wins the largest number of seats in the legislature normally forms the Government, and the party's leader becomes premier of the province (the head of government). The current government of the province is led by the Progressive Conservative Association of Nova Scotia, headed by Premier Tim Houston who was sworn into office in August 2021.

== History ==
In 1758, Nova Scotia was granted an elected assembly, becoming the first Canadian colony to enjoy a representative political institution. The representatives of Nova Scotia's House of Assembly were elected by a limited number of individuals who were required to own property and swear on certain oaths. This changed in 1836 when political reformer Joseph Howe started the movement for responsible government, a government that is dependent on the support of an elected assembly instead of a monarch or vicegerent. Under the guidance of Joseph Howe, who led the Reformers (Liberals), the first genuine political party appeared in the election of 1836. The first instance of responsible government in the British Empire outside of the United Kingdom itself was achieved by the colony of Nova Scotia in January and February 1848. Howe's push for responsible government was inspired by the work of Thomas McCulloch and Jotham Blanchard almost two decades earlier.

== Role of the Crown ==
The functions of the sovereign, Charles III, King of Canada and King in Right of Nova Scotia, are exercised by the Lieutenant Governor of Nova Scotia. The Lieutenant Governor is appointed by the Governor General of Canada on the recommendation of the Prime Minister of Canada, in consultation with the Premier of Nova Scotia. In the case of unconstitutional actions, the Lieutenant Governor has the power to dismiss a government by refusing a decision of the Executive Council. This power is rarely used as it would disrupt the affairs of the elected government.

== Premier ==
The Premier of Nova Scotia is the President of the Executive Council. Being the head of government in Nova Scotia, the premier exercises a substantial amount of power. James B. Uniacke was the first Premier of Nova Scotia and led the government from 1848 to 1854.

The current Premier, Tim Houston, was sworn in as premier on August 31, 2021. He is the 30th Premier of the Province of Nova Scotia since Confederation.

== Executive Council ==
The Executive Council (also known as Cabinet) makes the final decisions of the Government. It is responsible for the operations and management of government as well as for making key policy decisions. The Executive Council is made up of Ministers, who are conventionally also members of the House of Assembly (MLAs). They are chosen by the Premier and appointed by the Lieutenant Governor.

== Ministries ==
=== Departments ===
- Department of Advanced Education
- Department of Agriculture
- Department of Communities, Culture, Tourism, and Heritage
  - Acadian Affairs and Francophonie
  - African Nova Scotian Affairs
  - Gaelic Affairs
- Department of Community Services
- Department of Cyber Security and Digital Solutions
- Department of Economic Development
- Department of Education and Early Childhood Development
- Department of Environment and Climate Change
- Department of Finance and Treasury Board
- Department of Fisheries and Aquaculture
- Department of Health and Wellness
- Department of Intergovernmental Affairs
- Department of Justice
- Department of Labour, Skills and Immigration
- Department of Municipal Affairs and Housing
- Department of Natural Resources
- Department of Public Works
- Department of Seniors and Long-term Care
- Department of Service Nova Scotia

=== Offices and agencies ===
- Communications Nova Scotia (dissolved in 2025)
- Executive Council Office
- Emergency Management Office
- Office of Addictions and Mental Health
- Office of Equity and Anti-Racism Initiatives
- Office of the Fire Marshal
- Office of L'nu Affairs
- Office of Regulatory Affairs and Service Effectiveness
- Public Service Commission

== See also ==
- Politics of Nova Scotia
- General Assembly of Nova Scotia
- Nova Scotia House of Assembly
- Nova Scotia Guard
