= Carol Hoorn Fraser =

American-born Canadian artist (1930–1991)

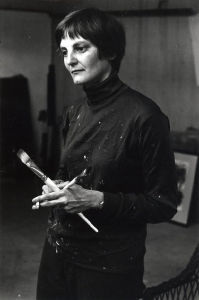
- Carol Hoorn Fraser at the easel, 1970s.
- Born: Carol Lucille Hoorn; 1930; Superior, Wisconsin
- Died: 1991; Halifax, Nova Scotia
- Known for: artist, writer, curator
- Spouse: John Fraser (m. 1956)

Carol Hoorn Fraser RCA (1930–1991) was an American-born figurative artist who worked and lived for thirty years in Nova Scotia, Canada.

== Biography ==
Carol Hoorn Fraser was born on September 5, 1930, in Depression-era Superior, Wisconsin. Her father, Arvid Hoorn, was a Swedish-American Lutheran pastor who built the family home and three churches himself. Her mother, Hazel, from an English tradition, did needlework, had an M.A. in Home Economics, and supported the family after Rev. Hoorn died of cancer in 1945.

Fraser attended Gustavus Adolphus College in Minnesota, graduating in 1951 with a major in chemistry and biology and a minor in art and literature. After a year as a research chemist at Archer Daniels Midland in St. Paul, she audited theology lectures at the University of Göttingen, Germany (1952–53), and then worked for a year as a nurse's aide in the cancer recovery ward at the University Hospital in Minneapolis. During this time she took extension classes and earned enough credits to be accepted into the Master of Fine Arts program at the University of Minnesota, from which she graduated in 1959 with a minor in Philosophy and a 125-page thesis on "The Human Image in Contemporary Painting". She was Lorenz Eitner's course assistant and took classes from Malcolm Myers, John Hospers, and Allen Tate, among others. Van Gogh and Käthe Kollwitz were particular heroes of hers. She exhibited widely in the Twin Cities.

She married Ph.D. student John Fraser in 1956 and, in 1961, when he accepted a job in the Dalhousie University English Department, moved with him to Halifax, Nova Scotia, where she was to spend the rest of her life, with time in Provence and Mexico. In 1977, she developed asthma and hyper-allergic sensitivities because of urea formaldehyde foam insulation.

Fraser's career as an artist spanned more than thirty years. During this time, she produced a large body of figurative work using a variety of media. In the later 1960s, she moved away from a modified Expressionism to a hard-edged organicism with ongoing ecological themes. In the 1980s, Fraser did a series of over a hundred strong-hued symbolical watercolors. She was also an avid gardener.

From 1964 to 1969, Fraser taught drawing part-time at the School of Architecture at the Technical University of Nova Scotia. During the seventies, she curated a show of Expressionist prints and was Acting Director of the Dalhousie University Art Gallery for a year, curating the Fourth Dalhousie Drawing Exhibition in 1979. She also did freelance public lecturing and some art-reviewing for ArtsAtlantic. She believed in clarity in art discourse, and practiced it herself.

Fraser died at her home in Halifax on April 3, 1991, of cancer of the lungs. A Frida Kahlo calendar was on the wall beside her bed.

== Publications ==
- The Expressionist Image, exhibition catalogue with introductory essay and descriptive commentary, Mount Saint Vincent Art Gallery, 1978.
- The 4th Dalhousie Drawing Exhibition, catalogue, Dalhousie Art Gallery, 1979.
- “Kokoschka; Knight-Errant of 20th-Century Painting,” memorial lecture, Dalhousie University Art Gallery, 1980.; printed in Article, Eye Level Gallery (Halifax), May 1980.
- “Tim Zuck—Paintings,” (exhibition review), ArtsAtlantic, 11, Spring 1981.
- “Actual Size—The Seventh Dalhousie Drawing Exhibition,” (review article), ArtsAtlantic, 20, Summer 1984.
- "Rockwell Kent: The Newfoundland Work," (review article), ArtsAtlantic, no. 29, Summer/Fall 1987.

== Awards ==
- Elected to the Royal Canadian Academy of Arts, 1976.
- Included in Who's Who in American Art, 1977.
- Included in Dictionary of International Biography, 1979.

== Solo exhibitions ==
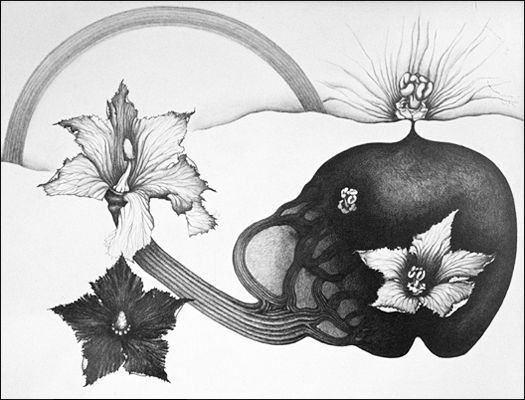
Squash Blossoms

- Penthouse Gallery, Montreal, 1964
- APAC Travelling Exhibition 1965–7
- Wells Gallery, Ottawa, 1967
- 'Carol Fraser; Paintings and Drawings, 1967–1977', travelling exhibition, Dalhousie University, 1977–78. Dalhousie University Art Gallery; Beaverbrook Art Gallery; Confederation Centre Art Gallery; Memorial Art Gallery; Burnaby Art Gallery; Southern Alberta University Art Gallery; Robert McLaughlin Gallery; Musée de Quebec.
- Dresden Galleries, Halifax, 1983
- Studio 21, Halifax, 1985–7–8–90
- 'Drawings by Carol Fraser', Beaverbrook Art Gallery, 1987–88. Beaverbrook Art Gallery; Saint Mary's University Art Gallery; Confederation Centre Art Gallery; Memorial University Art Gallery; Museum London; Robert McLaughlin Gallery.
- 'A Visionary Gaze; In Memoriam Carol Hoorn Fraser', Saint Mary's University Art Gallery, 1993–94; Saint Mary's University Art Gallery, Beaverbrook Art Gallery
- 'Carol Hoorn Fraser: Unfinished Business', Art Gallery of Nova Scotia, 2001

== Group exhibitions ==
- American Federation of Art Traveling International Exhibition, 1955–1958
- University of Minnesota Gallery, Minneapolis, 1956–7–8–9–60
- Walker Art Center Biennials 1956, 1958 (first prize and purchase award, 1958)
- UNESCO International Travelling Show, 1958–1959
- Minneapolis Institute of Art, Spring Biennial (first prize painting), 1959
- 'Sixteen Minnesota Artists', Walker Art Center (purchase award), 1960
- National Gallery of Canada Biennials, Ottawa, 1962–3–4
- 'Canadian Watercolours, Drawings and Prints', National Gallery of Canada, 1964
- Atlantic Pavilion, Expo '67, Montreal, 1967
- Montreal Museum of Fine Arts Spring Show, 1968
- New Talent Festival, Midtown Galleries, New York, 1974
- Nova Scotia Pavilion, Montreal Olympics, Montreal, 1976
- 'Painting Now', Agnes Etherington Art Centre, Kingston, 1976–1977
- Other Realities; the Legacy of Surrealism in Canadian Art', Agnes Etherington Art Centre, Kingston, 1978

== Public collections ==
Fraser's work is in the permanent collections of public institutions such as the National Gallery of Canada, the Art Gallery of Nova Scotia the Dalhousie University Art Gallery, Mount St Vincent Art Gallery, Halifax and elsewhere. A full list is given in her biography section in 'A Visionary Gaze; In Memoriam Carol Hoorn Fraser', Saint Mary's University Art Gallery, 1993–94.

== Bibliography ==
- 'Artscope—Carol Fraser', half-hour CBC TV program, producer-director Janet Smith, 1984
- Barry, Philippa, 'Interview with Carol Fraser,' ArtsAtlantic, no.25, Spring, 1986, pp. 33–35.
- Drawings by Carol Fraser 1948–1986, introd. Ian G. Lumsden, fore. Mimi Cazort, Fredericton, N. B., Beaverbrook Art Gallery, 1986.
- ArtsAtlantic, no.41, 1991.
- Lumsden, Ian G. 'The First Decade,' Charlottetown: Confederation Centre Art Gallery, 1975.
- MacLachlan, Mary E. Carol Fraser: Paintings and Drawings: 1967–1977, Halifax: Dalhousie Art Gallery, 1977.
- Drawings by Carol Fraser 1948–1986, introd. Ian G. Lumsden, fore. Mimi Cazort, Fredericton, N. B., Beaverbrook Art Gallery, 1986.
- Riordan, Bernard. Nova Scotia Art Bank. Halifax: Art Gallery of Nova Scotia, 1983.
- A Visionary Gaze: In Memoriam Carol Hoorn Fraser 1930–1991, Leighton Davis and John Fraser, Saint Mary's University Art Gallery, 1993
- Walker Art Center. 1958 Biennial Paintings Prints Sculpture, Minneapolis: Walker Art Center, 1958.
- Wiseman, Ian. 'Carol Fraser; the Triumph of Art over Allergy' Cities magazine, 1985.
