= 2016 Vancouver International Film Festival =

- Opening film: Maudie by Aisling Walsh
- Closing film: Voyage of Time by Terrence Malick
- Location: Vancouver, British Columbia, Canada
- Festival date: September 29–October 14, 2016

The 2016 Vancouver International Film Festival, the 35th event in the history of the Vancouver International Film Festival, was held from September 29 to October 14, 2016.

The festival's opening gala film was Aisling Walsh's Maudie, and its closing gala was Terrence Malick's Voyage of Time.

== Awards ==
Award winners were announced on October 14.

Award	Film	Filmmaker
People's Choice	Maudie	Aisling Walsh
Most Popular Canadian Documentary	Spirit Unforgettable	Pete McCormack
Most Popular International Feature	I, Daniel Blake	Ken Loach
Most Popular International Documentary	Human	Yann Arthus-Bertrand
Best Canadian Film	Window Horses	Ann Marie Fleming
Best Canadian Documentary	Living With Giants (Chez les géants)	Sebastien Rist, Aude Leroux-Lévesque
Best Canadian Short Film	Those Who Remain (Ceux qui restent)	Mathieu Vachon
Emerging Canadian Director	Never Eat Alone	Sofia Bohdanowicz
Best BC Film	Window Horses	Ann Marie Fleming
Best BC Short Film	Here Nor There	Julia Hutchings
Ignite Award	Cabbie	Jessica Parsons, Jennifer Chiu
BC Emerging Filmmaker	Hello Destroyer	Kevan Funk
Most Promising Director of a Canadian Short Film	Parent, Teacher	Roman Tchjen
VIFF Impact Award	Power to Change: The Energy Rebellion	Carl-A. Fechner

== Films ==
=== Special Presentations ===
- American Honey — Andrea Arnold
- The Birth of a Nation — Nate Parker
- Elle — Paul Verhoeven
- The Girl with All the Gifts — Colm McCarthy
- Graduation (Bacalaureat) — Cristian Mungiu
- The Handmaiden — Park Chan-wook
- Human — Yann Arthus-Bertrand
- I, Daniel Blake — Ken Loach
- Julieta — Pedro Almodóvar
- Manchester by the Sea — Kenneth Lonergan
- Milton's Secret — Barnet Bain
- Moonlight — Barry Jenkins
- Toni Erdmann — Maren Ade

=== Contemporary World Cinema ===
- Album — Mehmet Can Mertoğlu
- All of a Sudden (Auf Einmal) — Aslı Özge
- Aquarius — Kleber Mendonça Filho
- As I Open My Eyes (À peine j'ouvre les yeux) — Leyla Bouzid
- Barakah Meets Barakah — Mahmoud Sabbagh
- Beyond the Mountains and Hills (Me'Ever Laharim Velagvaot) — Eran Kolirin
- The Complexity of Happiness (La felicità è un sistema complesso) — Gianni Zanasi
- The Confessions (Le confessioni) — Roberto Andò
- The Death of Louis XIV (La Mort de Louis XIV) — Albert Serra
- Dolores — Michael Rösel
- Donald Cried — Kristopher Avedisian
- The Dreamed Path (Der traumhafte Weg) — Angela Schanelec
- Endless Poetry (Poesía sin fin) — Alejandro Jodorowsky
- The Giant (Jätten) — Johannes Nyholm
- Glory (Slava) — Kristina Grozeva, Petar Valchanov
- Golstone — Ivan Sen
- A Good Wife (Dobra žena) — Mirjana Karanović
- Green / Is / Gold — Ryon Baxter
- The Happiest Day in the Life of Olli Mäki (Hymyilevä mies) — Juho Kuosmanen
- Hedi — Mohamed Ben Attia
- Hermia and Helena — Matías Piñeiro
- History's Future — Fiona Tan
- The Human Surge (El auge del humano) — Eduardo Williams
- Inversion (Varoonegi) — Behnam Behzadi
- Junction 48 — Udi Aloni
- Kate Plays Christine — Robert Greene
- Kékszakállú — Gastón Solnicki
- Lantouri — Reza Dormishian
- The Last Family (Ostatnia rodzina) — Jan P. Matuszyński
- Like Crazy (La pazza gioia) — Paolo Virzì
- Lily Lane (Liliom ösvény) — Benedek Fliegauf
- Lost in Munich (Ztraceni v Mnichově) — Petr Zelenka
- A Man Called Ove (En man som heter Ove) — Hannes Holm
- Mother (Ema) — Kadri Kõusaare
- Nakom — Kelly Daniela Norris, T. W. Pittman
- Neruda — Pablo Larraín
- Original Bliss (Gleißendes Glück) — Sven Taddicken
- The Ornithologist (O Ornitólogo) — João Pedro Rodrigues
- Panamerican Machinery (Maquinaria Panamericana) — Joaquin del Paso
- Paterson — Jim Jarmusch
- Pihu — Vinod Kapri
- A Quiet Passion — Terence Davies
- Quit Staring at My Plate (Ne gledaj mi u pijat) — Hana Jušić
- Radio Dreams — Babak Jalali
- The Red Turtle (La Tortue Rouge) — Michaël Dudok de Wit
- The Rehearsal — Alison Maclean
- The River of Fables (Kothanodi) — Bhaskar Hazarika
- The Salesman — Asghar Farhadi
- Scarred Hearts (Inimi cicatrizate) — Radu Jude
- Shepherds and Butchers — Oliver Schmitz
- Short Stay — Ted Fendt
- Sieranevada — Cristi Puiu
- Sin Alas — Ben Chace
- Sins of the Flesh (Haram El Gasad) — Khaled El Hagar
- The Student — Kirill Serebrennikov
- Suntan — Argyris Papadimitropoulos
- Sweet Dreams (Fai bei sogni) — Marco Bellocchio
- Tanna — Martin Butler, Bentley Dean
- The Teacher (Učiteľka) — Jan Hřebejk
- To Keep the Light — Erica Fae
- The Trap (Ottaal) — Jayaraj Rajasekharan Nair
- Twilight Over Burma (Dämmerung über Burma) — Sabine Derflinger
- The Unknown Girl (La fille inconnue) — Jean-Pierre and Luc Dardenne
- The Yard (Yarden) — Måns Månsson

=== Spotlight on France ===
- After Love (L'Économie du couple) — Joachim Lafosse
- Being 17 (Quand on a 17 ans) — André Téchiné
- Chocolat — Roschdy Zem
- Frantz — François Ozon
- French Tour (Tour de France) — Rachid Djaïdani
- Personal Shopper — Olivier Assayas
- Saint-Amour — Benoît Delépine, Gustave de Kervern
- The Son of Joseph (Le Fils de Joseph) — Eugène Green
- Staying Vertical (Rester vertical) — Alain Guiraudie
- Thanks, Boss! (Merci patron!) — François Ruffin
- Things to Come (L'Avenir) — Mia Hansen-Løve

=== Documentaries ===
- All This Panic — Jenny Gage
- Between Fences (Bein gderot) — Avi Mograbi
- Depth Two (Dubina dva) — Ognjen Glavonić
- Ghostland — Simon Stadler
- Growing Up Coy — Eric Juhola
- The Infinite Flight of Days (El Infinito Vuelo de los Días) — Catalina Mesa
- Kedi — Ceyda Torun
- Keep Quiet — Joseph Martin, Sam Blair
- The Killing$ of Tony Blair — Sanne van den Bergh, Greg Ward
- Magnus — Benjamin Ree
- Portrait of a Garden (Portret van een tuin) — Rosie Stapel
- Prison Dogs — Perri Peltz, Geeta Gandbhir
- Seasons (Les Saisons) — Jacques Perrin, Jacques Cluzaud
- Shadow World — Johan Grimonprez
- Snow Monkey — George Gittoes
- Strangers on the Earth — Tristan Cook
- Tempestad — Tatiana Huezo
- Tickling Giants — Sara Taksler
- Tower — Keith Maitland
- When Two Worlds Collide — Heidi Brandenburg Sierralta, Mathew Orzel

=== True North ===
- 1:54 — Yan England
- Darwin — Benjamin Duffield
- The Intestine — Lev Lewis
- King Dave — Daniel Grou
- Lights Above Water (Lumières sur l'eau) — Nicolas Lachapelle, Ariel St-Louis Lamoureux
- Living With Giants (Chez les géants) — Aude Leroux-Lévesque, Sébastien Rist
- The Lockpicker — Randall Okita
- Mean Dreams — Nathan Morlando
- Nelly — Anne Émond
- Never Eat Alone — Sofia Bohdanowicz
- Of Ink and Blood (D'encre et de sang) — Alexis Fortier Gauthier, Maxim Rheault, Francis Fortin
- Old Stone — Johnny Ma
- The Other Half — Joey Klein
- Quebec My Country Mon Pays — John Walker
- Searchers (Maliglutit) — Zacharias Kunuk
- Shambles (Maudite poutine) — Karl Lemieux
- Split (Écartée) — Lawrence Côté-Collins
- Tales of Two Who Dreamt — Andrea Bussmann, Nicolás Pereda
- We Can't Make the Same Mistake Twice — Alanis Obomsawin
- Weirdos — Bruce McDonald
- Werewolf — Ashley McKenzie
- Where the Universe Sings: The Spiritual Journey of Lawren Harris — Nancy Lang, Peter Raymont

=== Gateway ===
- After the Storm — Hirokazu Kore-eda
- Alone — Park Hongmin
- The Bacchus Lady — E J-yong
- Beautiful 2016 — Jia Zhangke, Stanley Kwan, Hideo Nakata, Alec Su
- By the Time It Gets Dark — Anocha Suwichakornpong
- A Copy of My Mind — Joko Anwar
- Crosscurrent — Yang Chao
- Godspeed — Chung Mong-hong
- Harmonium — Kōji Fukada
- Hema Hema: Sing Me a Song While I Wait — Khyentse Norbu
- Knife in the Clear Water — Wang Xuebo
- Life After Life — Zhang Hanyi
- Lifeline — Akihiko Shiota
- The Long Excuse — Miwa Nishikawa
- Mother (Emma) — Riri Riza
- Mrs. — Adolfo Alix Jr.
- Our Love Story — Lee Hyun-ju
- Out of the Frying Pan... — Takashi Komatsu
- Phantom Detective — Jo Sung-hee
- The Road to Mandalay — Midi Z
- A Simple Goodbye — Degena Yun
- Ta'ang — Wang Bing
- Ten Years — Kwok Zune, Wong Fei-pang, Jevons Au, Chow Kwun-Wai, Ng Ka-leung
- While the Women Are Sleeping — Wayne Wang
- Yellowing — Chan Tze Woon
- Yourself and Yours — Hong Sang-soo

=== BC Spotlight ===
- Cadence — Alexander Lasheras
- Hello Destroyer — Kevan Funk
- Keepers of the Magic — Vic Sarin
- Koneline: Our Land Beautiful — Nettie Wild
- Marrying the Family — Peter Benson
- Mixed Match — Jeff Chiba Stearns
- A New Moon Over Tohoku — Linda Ohana
- Spirit Unforgettable — Pete McCormack
- The Unseen — Geoff Redknap
- Window Horses — Ann Marie Fleming

=== Impact ===
- Bugs — Andreas Johnsen
- Command and Control — Robert Kenner
- Fire at Sea (Fuocoammare) — Gianfranco Rosi
- Freightened: The Real Price of Shipping — Denis Delestrac
- Power to Change: The Energy Rebellion — Carl-A. Fechner
- Rat Film — Theo Anthony
- RiverBlue — David McIlvride, Roger Williams
- Sonita — Rokhsareh Ghaemmaghami
- Two Trains Runnin' — Sam Pollard

=== M/A/D ===
- The Architect — Jonathan Parker
- BANG! The Bert Berns Story — Bob Sarles, Brett Berns
- Burden — Tim Marrianan, Richard Dewey
- The Chinese Lives of Uli Sigg — Michael Schindhelm
- Don't Blink – Robert Frank — Laura Israel
- Franca: Chaos and Creation — Francesco Carrozzini
- Gimme Danger — Jim Jarmusch
- Harold and Lillian: A Hollywood Love Story — Daniel Raim
- Harry Benson: Shoot First — Matthew Miele, Justin Bare
- I Called Him Morgan — Kasper Collin
- The Model — Mads Matthiesen
- Playing Lecuona — Juan Manuel Villar Betancort, Pavel Giroud
- Reset (Relève) — Thierry Demaizière and Alban Teurlai
- Versus: The Life and Films of Ken Loach — Louise Osmond
- Vita Activa: The Spirit of Hannah Arendt — Ada Ushpiz
- We Are X — Stephen Kijak
- Yarn — Una Lorenzen
- Yohji Yamamoto: Dressmaker — Ngo The Chau

=== Altered States ===
- Another Evil — Carson Mell
- The Eyes of My Mother — Nicolas Pesce
- In a Valley of Violence — Ti West
- Lavender — Ed Gass-Donnelly
- Little Sister — Zach Clark
- The Love Witch — Anna Biller
- Operation Avalanche — Matt Johnson
- She's Allergic to Cats — Michael Reich
- Under the Shadow — Babak Anvari
- We Are the Flesh (Temenos la carne) — Emiliano Rocha Minter

=== Canadian Short Films ===
- 24.24.24 — Daniel Dietzel
- Another Prayer — Sofia Bohdanowicz
- As Dinosaurs — Émilie Rosas
- Beyond Blue Waves — Joëlle Desjardins Paquette
- Black Cop — Cory Bowles
- Blind Vaysha — Theodore Ushev
- A Brief History of the Apocalypse — Erica Généreux Smith
- By the Pool — Karine Bélanger
- Cabbie — Jessica Parsons, Jennifer Chiu
- The Cameraman — Connor Gaston
- Carver — Jeremy Wamiss
- Cave of Sighs — Nathan Douglas
- Clouds — Diego Maclean
- Colour — Taryn Birket, Alannah Johnson
- A Dance For... — Emily Feng
- DataMine — Tim Tracey
- Dora Blondin — Iris, Naomi, Paige, Tayla
- Einst — Jessica Johnson
- Emma — Martin Edralin
- An Evening — Sofia Bohdanowicz
- Fantassut/Rain on the Borders — Federica Foglia
- Fish — Heather Young
- Four Faces of the Moon — Amanda Strong
- Ganjy — Benjamin Ratner
- Here Nor There — Julia Hutchings
- Homesick — Sophie Jarvis
- I Am Here — Eoin Duffy
- If You See Something — Daria Azizian
- Imitations — Markus Henkel, Milos Mitrovic, Ian Bawa, Fabian Velasco
- It's No Real Pleasure in Life — Nikolay Michaylov
- Last Night — Joel Salaysay
- Late Night Drama — Patrice Laliberté
- The Lift — Manny Mahal
- Mamie — Janice Nadeau
- The Movieland Movie — Zachary Kerrholden
- My Body — Annie Kruger, Danica Denommé, Florence Dubé, Ryan Titus
- The New Canada — Alexander Carson
- Nine Behind — Sophy Romvari
- Nutag: Homeland — Alisi Telengut
- Oh What a Wonderful Feeling — François Jaros
- Old Man — Alicia Eisen
- Parent, Teacher — Roman Tchjen
- Popsong — Matthew Taylor Blais
- A Prayer — Sofia Bohdanowicz
- Ranger — Sandra Ignagni
- Seven Stars — Sofia Banzhaf
- Sigismond Imageless — Albéric Aurtenèche
- Srorrim — Wayne Wapeemukwa
- Stone Makers (Carrière) — Jean-Marc E. Roy
- The Taste of Vietnam — Pier-Luc Latulippe
- This Home Is Not Empty — Carol Nguyen
- Those Who Remain (Ceux qui restent) — Mathieu Vachon
- Two — Christopher Spencer-Lowe
- Vlad the Unemployed — Ashley Kobayashi
- Wild Skin (La Peau sauvage) — Ariane Louis-Seize
- Your Mother and I — Anna Maguire

=== International Short Films ===
- Aeris — Lukas Huffman
- Affordance — Nove Hatayo
- Albedo Absolute — Vlad Marsavin
- Après Suzanne — Félix Moati
- As One — Alan Powell
- Best Efforts — Hadley Hillel
- Between Them — Alexia Maltner
- Black Pudding — Nicole Nabi
- Catch — Dominic Rees-Roberts, Paul Cooke
- Champion — Andrés Passoni
- Conslitruction — Nakanishi Yoshihisa
- Datum Point — Orikawa Ryo
- Dear Drew — Dylan Shapiro
- Don't Leave Me — Laura Jou
- Éclair — Hugo Keijzer
- Eden Hostel — Gonzaga Manso
- Encounter — Fabrizio Rinaldi
- Fabrizio's Initiation — Mariano Biasin
- Finder — Satoh Yoshinao
- Friday Night — Alexis Michalik
- Grown Up — Hong-Ruei Lin
- Heaven — Hirabayashi Isamu
- Her Paradise — Shobi Sen
- How to Get People to Like You — Alexandra Yakovleva
- I Have the Future — Ouchi Rieko
- I Love Anna — Joonas Rutanen
- Indefinite Pitch — James N. Kienitz Wilkins
- The Laughing Spider — Tanaami Keiichi
- The Law of Moments — Emma Samms
- Litterbugs — Peter Stanley-Ward
- Lock In — Neville Pierce
- Minor Setback — Augustine Frizzell
- On the Roof — Damia Serra Cauchetiez
- Out of the Village — Jonathan Stein
- Painterbrain — Glenn Diehl
- Paris, 1971 — David Khachatorian
- Promise — Akihiko Shiota
- Rotten Love — Matt Lacorte
- Sanun — Kyle Nieva, Miggy Hilario
- Soju and Ice Cream — Lee Kwang-kuk
- The Sparrow's Flight — Tom Schroeder
- Stars — Krista Vernoff
- This Modern Man Is Beat — Alex Merkin
- Three Minute Warning — Iqbal Mohammed
- Tide — Alexander von Hofmann
- Today They Took My Son — Pierre Dawalibi
- Vanya — Christine Rabotenko
- Walden Pink — Peter Bolte
- When Day Is Done — Brandon Roots
- Winds of Furnace — Yamil Quintana
- Without You — Nariman Aliev
