= San Diego Film Critics Society Award for Best Actress =

Annual US film award

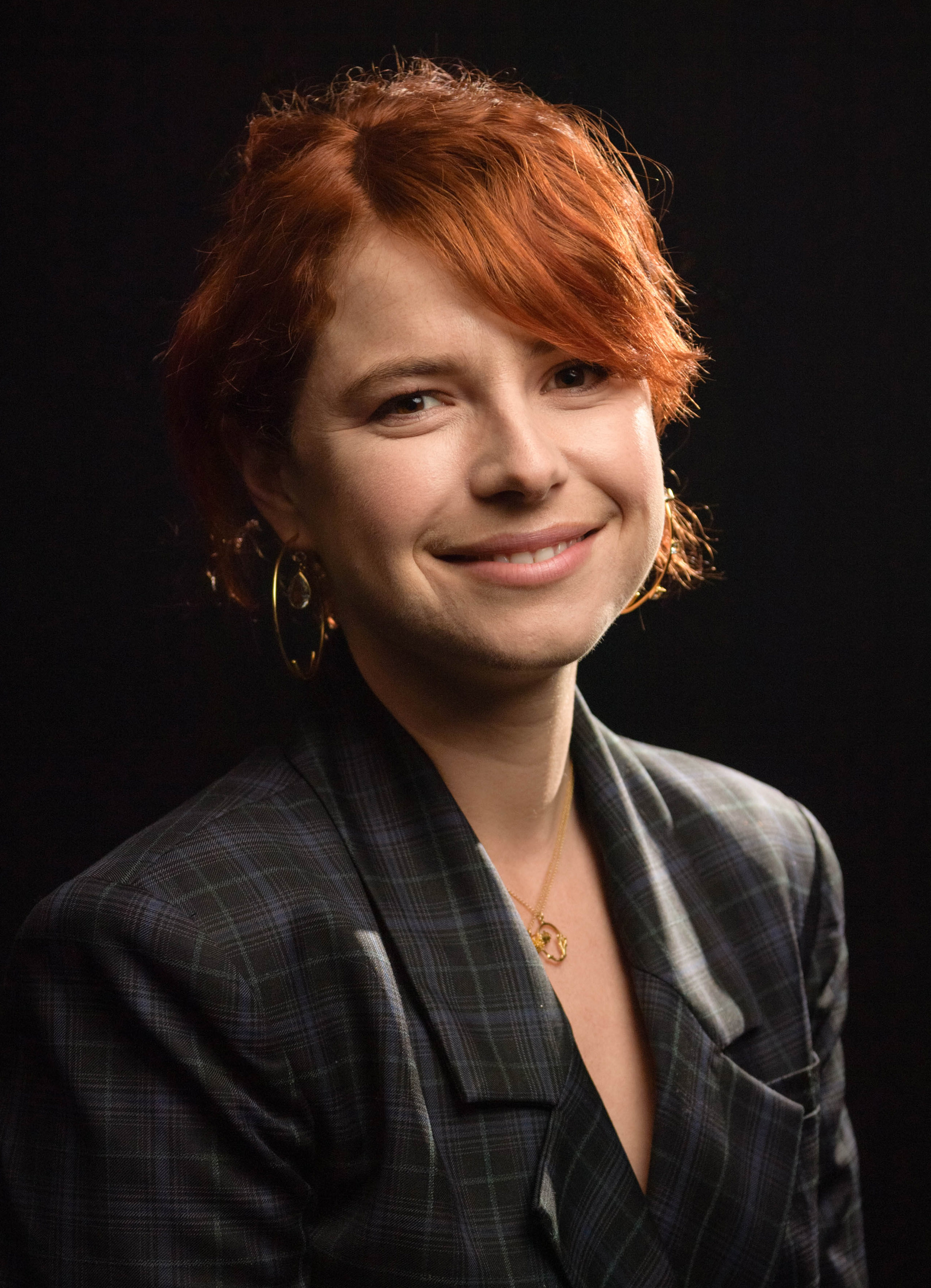
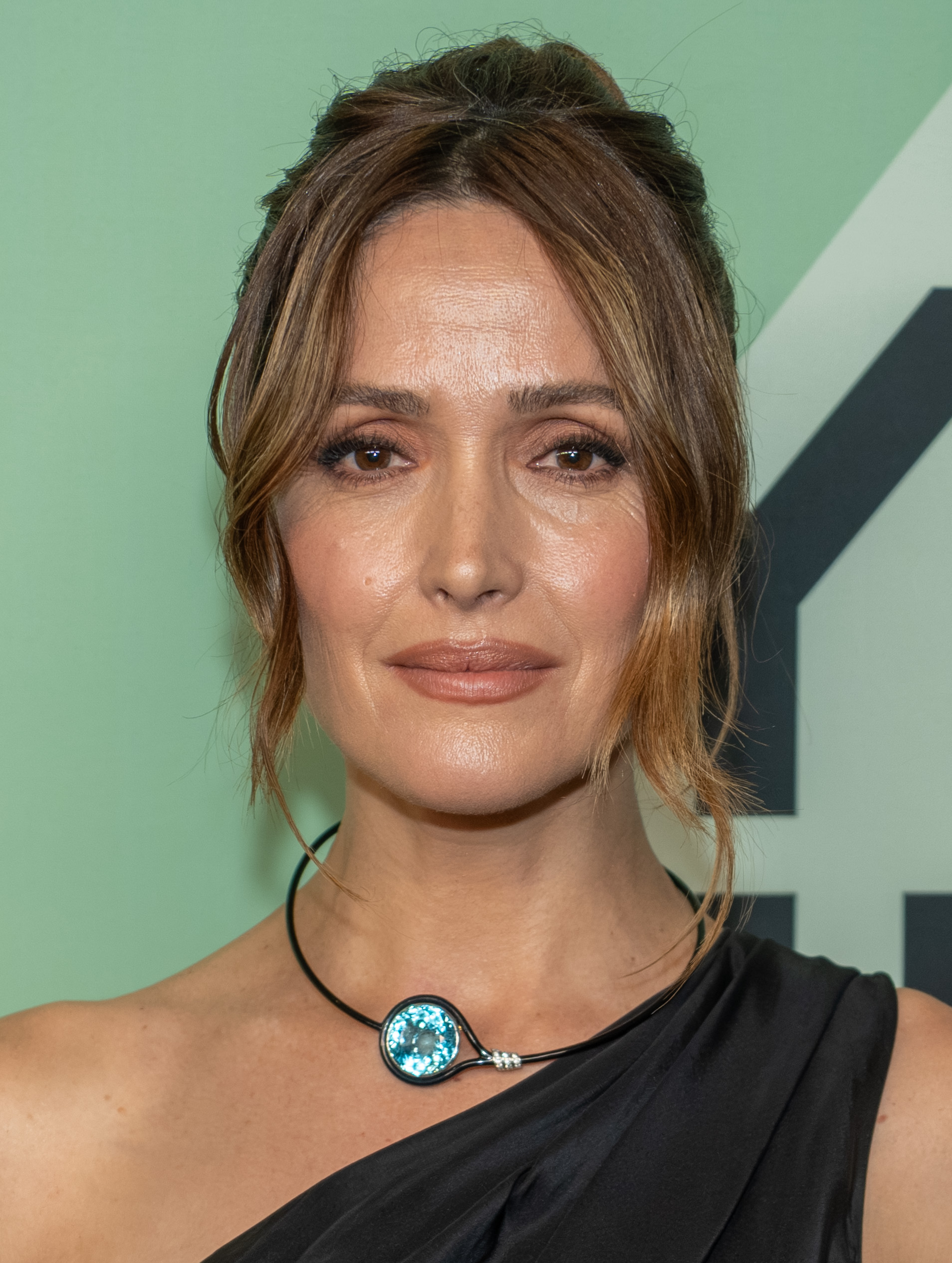
- The 2025 recipients: Jessie Buckley (left) and Rose Byrne (right)
- Awarded for: Best Performance by an Actress in a Leading Role
- Country: United States
- Presented by: San Diego Film Critics Society
- First award: Frances McDormand in Fargo
- Currently held by: Jessie Buckley in Hamnet / Rose Byrne in If I Had Legs I'd Kick You
- Website: sdfcs.org

The San Diego Film Critics Society Award for Best Actress is an award given by the San Diego Film Critics Society to honor the finest female acting achievements in film-making.

== Winners ==
=== 1990s ===
Year	Winner	Film	Role
1996	Frances McDormand	Fargo	Marge Gunderson
1997	Pam Grier	Jackie Brown	Jackie Brown
1997	Bai Ling	Red Corner	Shen Yuelin
1998	Susan Sarandon	Stepmom	Jackie Harrison
1999	Annette Bening	American Beauty	Carolyn Burnham

=== 2000s ===
Year	Winner	Film	Role
2000	Laura Linney	You Can Count on Me	Sammy Prescott
2000	Julia Roberts	Erin Brockovich	Erin Brockovich
2001	Thora Birch	Ghost World	Enid
2002	Julianne Moore	Far from Heaven	Cathy Whitaker
2003	Naomi Watts	21 Grams	Cristina Peck
2004	Imelda Staunton	Vera Drake	Vera Drake
2005	Joan Allen	The Upside of Anger	Terry Wolfmeyer
2006	Helen Mirren	The Queen	Queen Elizabeth II
2007	Julie Christie	Away from Her	Fiona Anderson
2008	Kate Winslet	The Reader	Hanna Schmitz
2009	Michelle Monaghan	Trucker	Diane Ford

=== 2010s ===
Year	Winner	Film	Role
2010	Jennifer Lawrence	Winter's Bone	Ree Dolly
2011	Brit Marling	Another Earth	Rhoda Williams
2012	Michelle Williams	Take This Waltz	Margot
2013	Cate Blanchett	Blue Jasmine	Jeanette "Jasmine" Francis
2014	Marion Cotillard	Two Days, One Night	Sandra Bya
2015	Brie Larson	Room	Joy "Ma" Newsome
2016	Sônia Braga	Aquarius	Dona Clara Bragança
2017	Sally Hawkins	Maudie	Maud Lewis
2018	Glenn Close	The Wife	Joan Castleman
2019	Lupita Nyong'o	Us	Adelaide Wilson / Red

=== 2020s ===
Year	Winner	Film	Role
2020	Carey Mulligan	Promising Young Woman	Cassie Thomas
2021	Caitríona Balfe	Belfast	Ma
2021	Penélope Cruz	Parallel Mothers	Janis Martínez
2022	Danielle Deadwyler	Till	Mamie Till-Mobley
2023	Lily Gladstone	Killers of the Flower Moon	Mollie Kyle
2024	Marianne Jean-Baptiste	Hard Truths	Pansey
2025	Jessie Buckley	Hamnet	Agnes Shakespeare
2025	Rose Byrne	If I Had Legs I'd Kick You	Linda
