= Lázaro at Night =

- Spanish: Lázaro de noche
- Directed by: Nicolás Pereda
- Screenplay by: Nicolás Pereda
- Produced by: Nicolás Pereda
- Starring: Lázaro G. Rodríguez; Luisa Pardo; Francisco Barreiro; Teresita Sánchez; Gabriel Nuncio; Clarissa Malheiros
- Cinematography: Nicolás Pereda
- Edited by: Nicolás Pereda
- Music by: Natalia Pérez Turner; Gonzalo Gutiérrez; Leonardo Chávez
- Release date: June 27, 2024 (FID Marseille)
- Running time: 76 minutes
- Countries: Mexico; Canada
- Language: Spanish

Lázaro at Night (Spanish: Lázaro de noche) is a 2024 Canadian-Mexican docufiction film, directed by Nicolás Pereda. Made in conjunction with the Mexican theatre collective Lagartijas Tiradas al Sol, the film centres on Lázaro Rodríguez, Luisa Pardo and Francisco Barreiro, three actors in the collective who become embroiled in a love triangle while auditioning for roles in a film, while being forced to evaluate their own personal lives due to the director's unorthodox casting methods.

The film premiered in June 2024 at the Marseille Festival of Documentary Film, and had its North American premiere in the Wavelengths program at the 2024 Toronto International Film Festival.
