= Copper (2025 film) =

- Spanish: Cobre
- Directed by: Nicolás Pereda
- Screenplay by: Nicolás Pereda; Juan Francisco Maldonado
- Produced by: Nicolás Pereda; Paula Mónaco
- Starring: Lázaro G. Rodríguez; Teresita Sánchez; Rosa Estela Juárez Vargas; Harold Torres
- Cinematography: Miguel Tovar
- Edited by: Nicolás Pereda
- Music by: Nicolás Pereda
- Release date: July 9, 2025 (FID Marseille)
- Running time: 78 minutes
- Countries: Mexico; Canada
- Language: Spanish

Copper (Spanish: Cobre) is a 2025 Canadian-Mexican docufiction film, directed by Nicolás Pereda. The film stars Lázaro G. Rodríguez as Lázaro, a man navigating Mexican government bureaucracy to obtain an oxygen tank due to his poor health from years working in the local copper mines, who unexpectedly finds a dead body by the side of the road.

The cast also includes Teresita Sánchez, Rosa Estela Juárez Vargas, Harold Torres, Francisco Barreiro, José Rodríguez López, Mariana Villegas and Norma Pablo in supporting roles.

The film premiered at the FIDMarseille festival on July 9, 2025, where it received a Special Jury Mention from the international competition jury. It had its North American premiere on September 12 at the 2025 Toronto International Film Festival.
