= Must Read After My Death =

- Directed by: Morgan Dews
- Written by: Morgan Dews
- Produced by: Morgan Dews
- Music by: Paul Damian Hogan
- Distributed by: Gigantic Releasing
- Release date: November 28, 2007 (IDFA); February 20, 2009 (Theatrical)
- Running time: 74 minutes
- Country: United States
- Language: English

Must Read After My Death is a 2009 documentary film written, produced, and directed by Morgan Dews. It is a story about Allis and her husband Charley, in Hartford, Connecticut in the 1960s.

The film's soundtrack was composed by the Emmy-nominated musician Paul Damian Hogan.

== Synopsis ==
When a Hartford couple turns to psychiatry for help with their marriage, things quickly spiral out of control. Couples counseling, individual and group therapy, and 24-hour marathon sessions ensue. Their four children suffer and are given their own psychiatrists. Pills are prescribed, people are institutionalized, and shock therapy is administered. The story is told by the family itself, from a collection of audio recordings and home movies, illuminating a difficult and extraordinary time.

== Production ==
Must Read After My Death was created after Dews found a trove of video and tape belonging to his late grandmother, Allis. The documentary does not include interviews with Allis' grown children and focuses only on her video and audio diary.

== Distribution ==
The film had its US premiere in 2008 at the LA Film Festival. Gigantic Digital released Must Read After My Death in February 2009. It was the first film to be released day-and-date in theaters and online. Gigantic managed to control the availability of the film online, blocking it in markets where the film was playing theatrically.

== Critical response ==
The film received critical acclaim, receiving 90% positive reviews at the website Rotten Tomatoes.

=== Accolades ===
Year	Award	Category	Nominee(s)	Result
2007	Amsterdam International Documentary Film Festival	Joris Ivens Award	Must Read After My Death	Nominated
2008	Marseille Festival of Documentary Film	Grand Prix of the International Competition	Must Read After My Death	Won
2008	International Documentary Film Festival of Navarra Punto de Vista	Special Mention	Must Read After My Death	Won
2008	Doclisboa International Film Festival	Odisseia Award for 1st Documentary	Must Read After My Death	Won
2008	Festival dei Popoli Florence	Audience Award & Special Mention	Must Read After My Death	Won
2008	Filmer à tout prix	Gala Opening Film	Must Read After My Death	Won
2010	Shanghai International TV Festival	Magnolia Award, History & Biography Documentary Golden Award	Must Read After My Death	Won
