= Everything Else Is Noise =

2026 docufiction by Nicolás Pereda

- Spanish: Lo demás es ruido
- Directed by: Nicolás Pereda
- Written by: Nicolás Pereda; Juan Francisco Maldonado
- Produced by: Catalina Pereda
- Starring: Teresita Sánchez; Lázaro G. Rodríguez; Luisa Pardo; Francisco Barreiro
- Cinematography: Nicolás Pereda
- Edited by: Nicolás Pereda
- Production companies: En Chinga Producciones; Weltfilm
- Release date: February 14, 2026 (Berlin)
- Running time: 71 minutes
- Countries: Canada; Germany; Mexico
- Language: Spanish

Everything Else Is Noise (Spanish: Lo demás es ruido) is a 2026 docufiction directed by Nicolás Pereda. A co-production of Canada, Germany, and Mexico, it stars Teresita Sánchez as Teresa, a cellist and composer whose televised interview with journalist Lázaro (Lázaro G. Rodríguez) turns into a comedy of errors.

The film had its world premiere in the Forum section of the 76th Berlin International Film Festival on February 14, 2026.

== Cast ==
- Teresita Sánchez as Teresa
- Lázaro G. Rodríguez as Lázaro
- Luisa Pardo as Teresa's daughter
- Francisco Barreiro as the cameraman

== Release ==
The film premiered at the 76th Berlin International Film Festival. It was subsequently screened at the Las Palmas de Gran Canaria International Film Festival, where it was the winner of the Lady Harimaguada de Oro, and at the Marseille Festival of Documentary Film.

It had its North American premiere in the Wavelengths section of the 2026 Toronto International Film Festival. It was also selected for the Main Slate of the 2026 New York Film Festival.
