= Maudie (film) =

2016 film

- Theatrical release poster
- Directed by: Aisling Walsh
- Written by: Sherry White
- Produced by: Bob Cooper; Mary Young Leckie; Mary Sexton; Susan Mullen
- Starring: Sally Hawkins; Ethan Hawke
- Cinematography: Guy Godfree
- Edited by: Stephen O'Connell
- Music by: Michael Timmins
- Production companies: Rink Rat Productions; Screen Door; Parallel Films
- Distributed by: Mongrel Media (Canada); Sony Pictures Classics (Ireland)
- Release dates: 2 September 2016 (Telluride); 14 April 2017 (Canada); July 2017 (Ireland)
- Running time: 116 minutes
- Countries: Ireland; Canada
- Language: English
- Budget: $5.6 million
- Box office: $9.7 million

Maudie is a 2016 biographical drama film directed by Aisling Walsh and starring Sally Hawkins and Ethan Hawke. A co-production of Ireland and Canada, it is about the life of folk artist Maud Lewis, who painted in Nova Scotia. In the story, Maud (Hawkins) struggles with rheumatoid arthritis, the memory of a lost child, and a family that doubts her abilities, before moving in with a surly fish peddler (Hawke) as a housekeeper. Despite their differing personalities, they marry as her art gains in popularity. The film was shot in Newfoundland and Labrador, requiring a re-creation of Lewis' famously small house.

It premiered at the Telluride Film Festival in 2016. It was selected for the Special Presentations section of the 2016 Toronto International Film Festival and won a number of awards at other festivals. After festival screenings and wider releases, it received positive reviews, and won critics societies' awards for Hawkins' performance; seven Canadian Screen Awards, including Best Motion Picture; and three Irish Film & Television Awards, including Best Director and Best International Actor for Ethan Hawke.

== Plot ==
In Marshalltown, Nova Scotia, Maud Dowley lives with her Aunt Ida and brother Charles in the 1930s. She has severe arthritis and is shocked to learn that Charles has sold their family home, which their parents had left to him. In the meantime, she is berated by Ida about visiting the local nightclub. Maud had once been impregnated and gave birth, but Charles and Ida told her that the child was deformed and died.

At a store, Maud sees the inarticulate and rough fish peddler Everett Lewis place an advertisement for a cleaning lady. Maud answers the call and takes the position in exchange for room and board. Everett's house is very small, and the two are known to share a bed. This causes scandal in the town, with gossip that Maud is offering sexual services. While attempting to clean the shack, Maud paints a shelf. She begins painting flowers and birds on the walls, for aesthetic improvement. She meets one of Everett's customers, Sandra from New York City, who is intrigued by Maud's paintings and buys cards which Maud has decorated. She later commissions Maud to make a larger painting for five dollars.

Maud persuades Everett to marry her. Her paintings receive more exposure and newspaper coverage and she begins to sell them from their house. U.S. Vice President Richard Nixon contacts the Lewises to buy one. After the couple is featured on TV news, Everett becomes disturbed that local viewers see him as cold and cruel. Ida, increasingly ill, also saw the coverage, and Maud wants to see her before her aunt dies.

Ida tells Maud that she is the only Dowley who ever found happiness, and confesses Maud's baby girl did not die. Believing Maud could never care for a child, Charles had adopted the baby out to a family for a price. Maud is devastated, and Everett becomes convinced their relationship has brought him nothing but emotional anguish. The two separate.

After Everett and Maud reconcile, Everett takes her to the home of the adoptive family, where from a distance Maud sees her grown daughter for the first time. However, Maud's physical state is deteriorating, and she dies at a hospital, telling Everett she was loved.

== Cast ==
- Sally Hawkins as Maud Lewis
- Ethan Hawke as Everett Lewis
- Kari Matchett as Sandra
- Zachary Bennett as Charles
- Gabrielle Rose as Aunt Ida
- Greg Malone as Mr. Hill

== Production ==
=== Development ===
According to producer Mary Sexton, attempts at a biographical film about Maud Lewis were made for 10 years. After screenwriter Sherry White's work was submitted to director Aisling Walsh for consideration, she opted to commit to the project, claiming she contacted her agent after reading only about 30 pages. She said the film "celebrates this woman who was rather amazing… She worked so hard at it, and in such tough conditions sometimes." The filmmakers chose not to emphasize Lewis' physical disability, as they felt it did not form the entirety of her identity. Walsh described Lewis' biography as "a very Canadian story, it's a very Nova Scotian story".

The film was shot in Ireland and Newfoundland rather than Nova Scotia, where Lewis painted, while film production had become more rare in Nova Scotia as crews moved to Toronto and British Columbia. Producers believed Newfoundlanders could provide more funding for cinema, while the project also received financial support from Ontario and Ireland, the latter being where Walsh and much of her team were from. The Nova Scotia government reduced its film credit program in 2014, which has also been cited as a reason the film was not shot there.

=== Casting ===
Walsh sent actress Sally Hawkins, a hobbyist painter, photographs of Lewis, and Hawkins attempted to imitate Lewis' style in her art. Sean Bean was cast as Everett Lewis, but left the project due to other commitments, and was replaced by Ethan Hawke. Hawke accepted the role for his fondness of Atlantic Canada (he owns property in Guysborough, Nova Scotia).

Kari Matchett, a Canadian actress, developed the accent for her New Yorker character after travel to the U.S. Matchett's agent sent her the screenplay, and when she enjoyed it, her agent lobbied persistently for the role. Zachary Bennett and Gabrielle Rose were also given supporting roles.

=== Filming ===
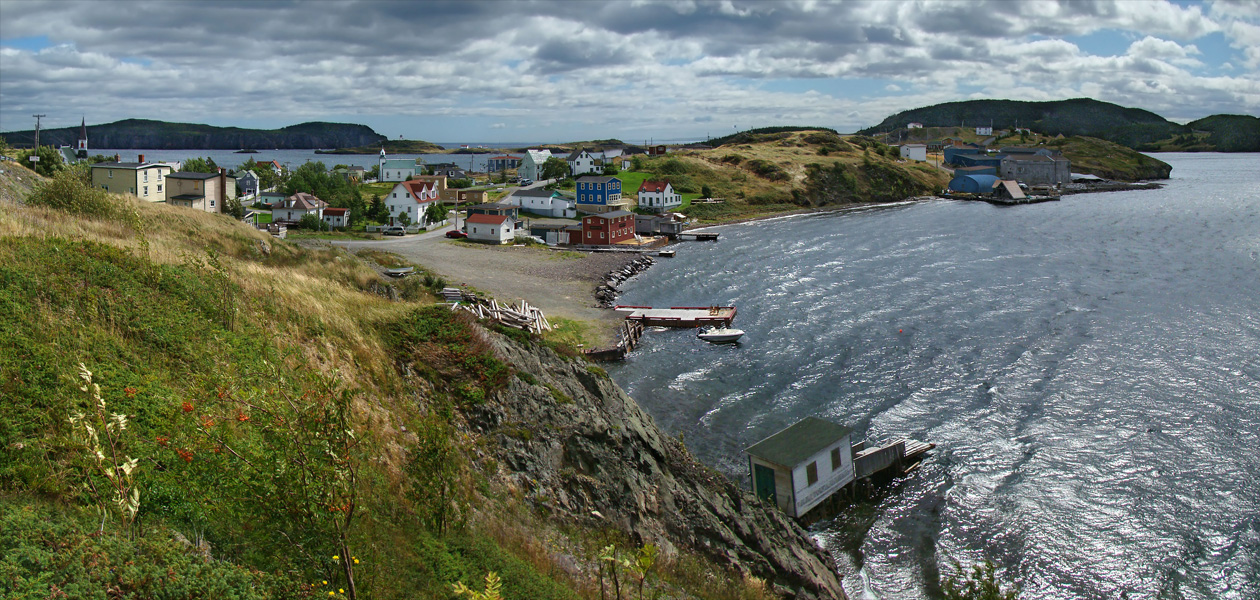
Trinity Bay, Newfoundland and Labrador was used as a filming location.

Maudie was filmed in areas around St. John's, Newfoundland and Labrador in fall 2015, with finances from the Newfoundland and Labrador Film Development Corporation. Walsh felt the landscape of Keels and Trinity Bay was reminiscent of the Digby area in the 1930s and 1940s.

In life, Lewis had a very small house, at 10 ft × 12 ft (3.0 m × 3.7 m), and Walsh wished to be accurate in creating a replica, but the recreation of the house had to be enlarged to accommodate a film crew. Walsh personally painted some of the flowers on the walls. The crew also gathered houseflies for weeks to depict an infestation of the house, particularly for the scene where Maud attempts to persuade Everett to buy a screen door.

== Release ==
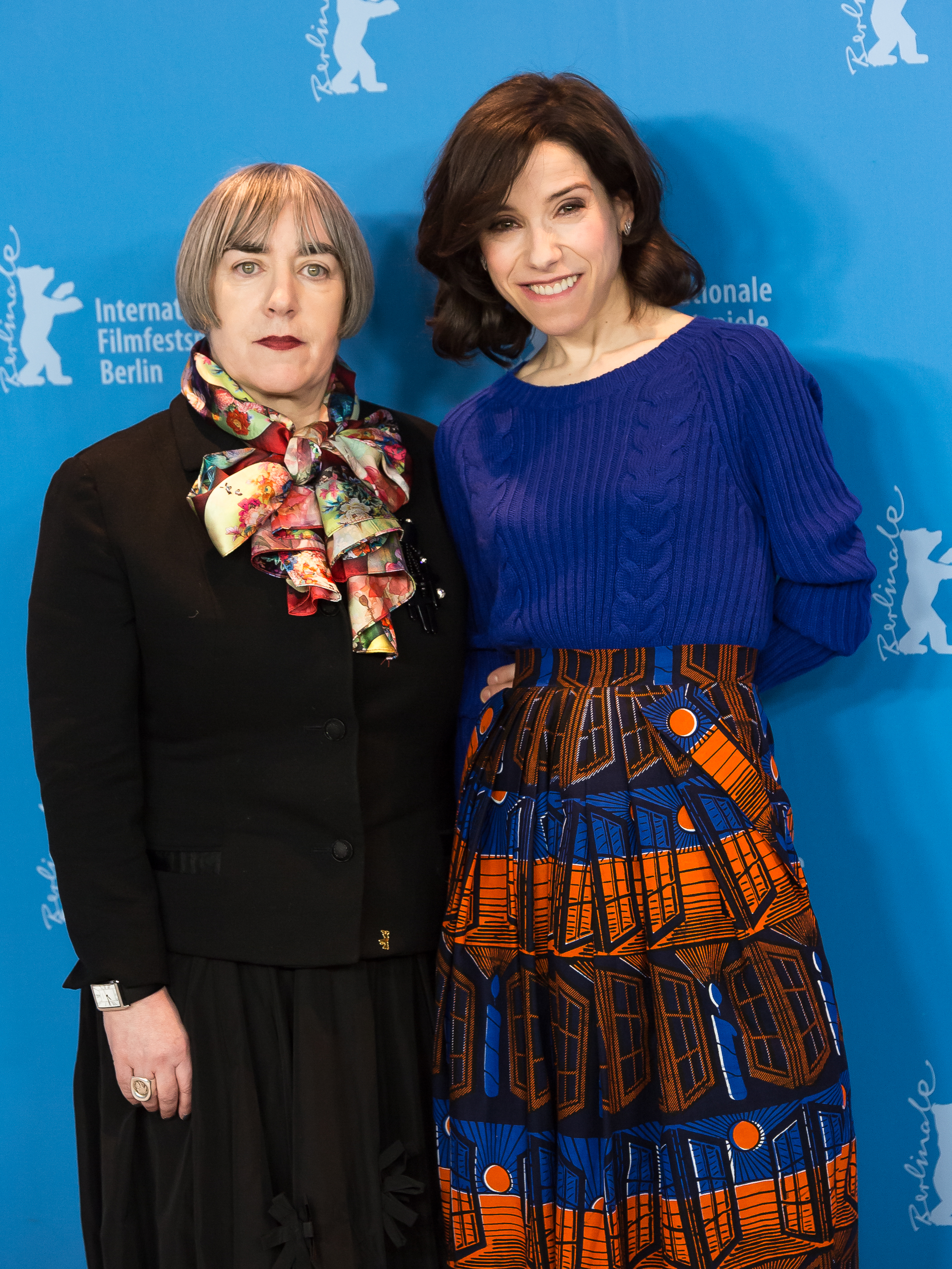
Director Aisling Walsh and Sally Hawkins at the Berlinale 2017.

Maudie had its world premiere at the 2016 Telluride Film Festival, before screening at major Canadian film festivals, including as a gala at the Atlantic Film Festival, the Calgary International Film Festival, and the Vancouver International Film Festival. It was featured in the Special Presentations section at the 2016 Toronto International Film Festival, and was screened at the 2017 Berlin International Film Festival.

The film's wider Canadian theatrical release took place on 14 April 2017 in Halifax, Nova Scotia, Toronto, Ottawa and Vancouver. Plans were made for it to screen all weekend in Halifax, during which the newly found painting Portrait of Eddie Barnes and Ed Murphy, Lobster Fishermen, Bay View, N.S. would be on temporary exhibit in the Scotiabank Maud Lewis Gallery located at the Art Gallery of Nova Scotia. It subsequently opened in Edmonton, Calgary, Montreal, Victoria, British Columbia and Winnipeg on 21 April. Sony Pictures Classics acquired rights to distribute the film in the U.S., U.K., Ireland, Latin America, Scandinavia, Italy, South Africa, Portugal, Turkey, Greece, Cyprus and select Asian and Eastern European territories, scheduling a theatrical release in the U.S. on 16 June. On 27 April, it was showing on 30 screens, half of which were in Atlantic Canada, while Mongrel Media planned releases in the United Kingdom, Europe, Australia and Japan by the end of 2017.

== Reception ==
=== Box office ===
In Canada, the film grossed $1 million by 3 May, on 76 screens. It placed first in the Atlantic box office, grossing $4,000 during each showing. Mongrel claimed that in some theatres, Maudie outperformed the mainstream action film The Fate of the Furious.

In its first three days in the U.S., Maudie made $49,842 in four theatres in Los Angeles and New York, a decent performance in niche cinema. The film has grossed $6,191,760 in North America and $3,543,354 in other territories, for a worldwide total of $9,735,114.

=== Critical response ===
On Rotten Tomatoes, the film has an approval rating of 89% based on 151 reviews, with an average rating of 7.1/10. The website's critical consensus reads, "Maudie's talented cast — particularly Sally Hawkins in the title role — breathe much-needed depth into a story that only skims the surface of a fascinating life and talent." On Metacritic, the film has a weighted average score of 65 out of 100, based on 34 critics, indicating "generally favorable reviews".

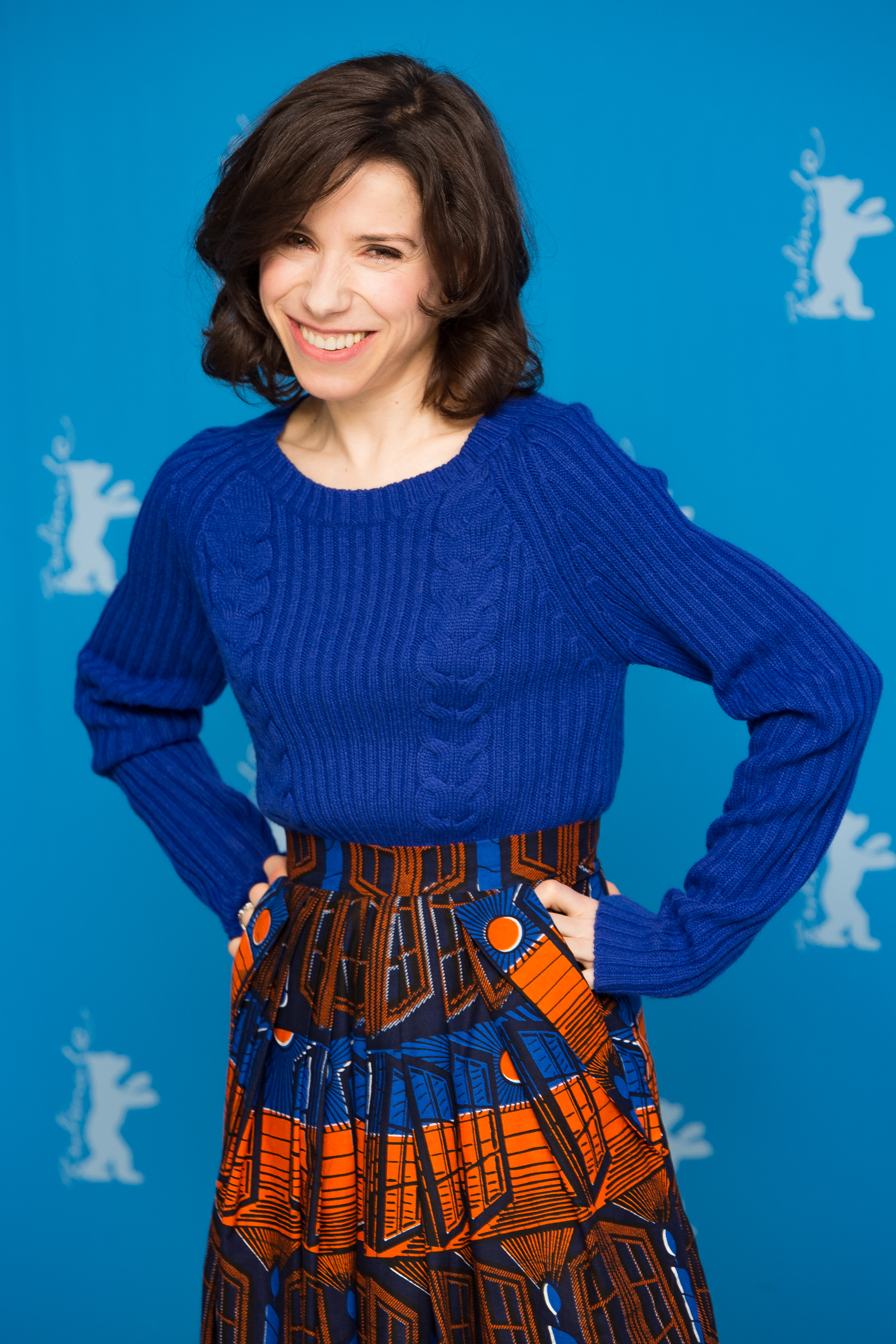
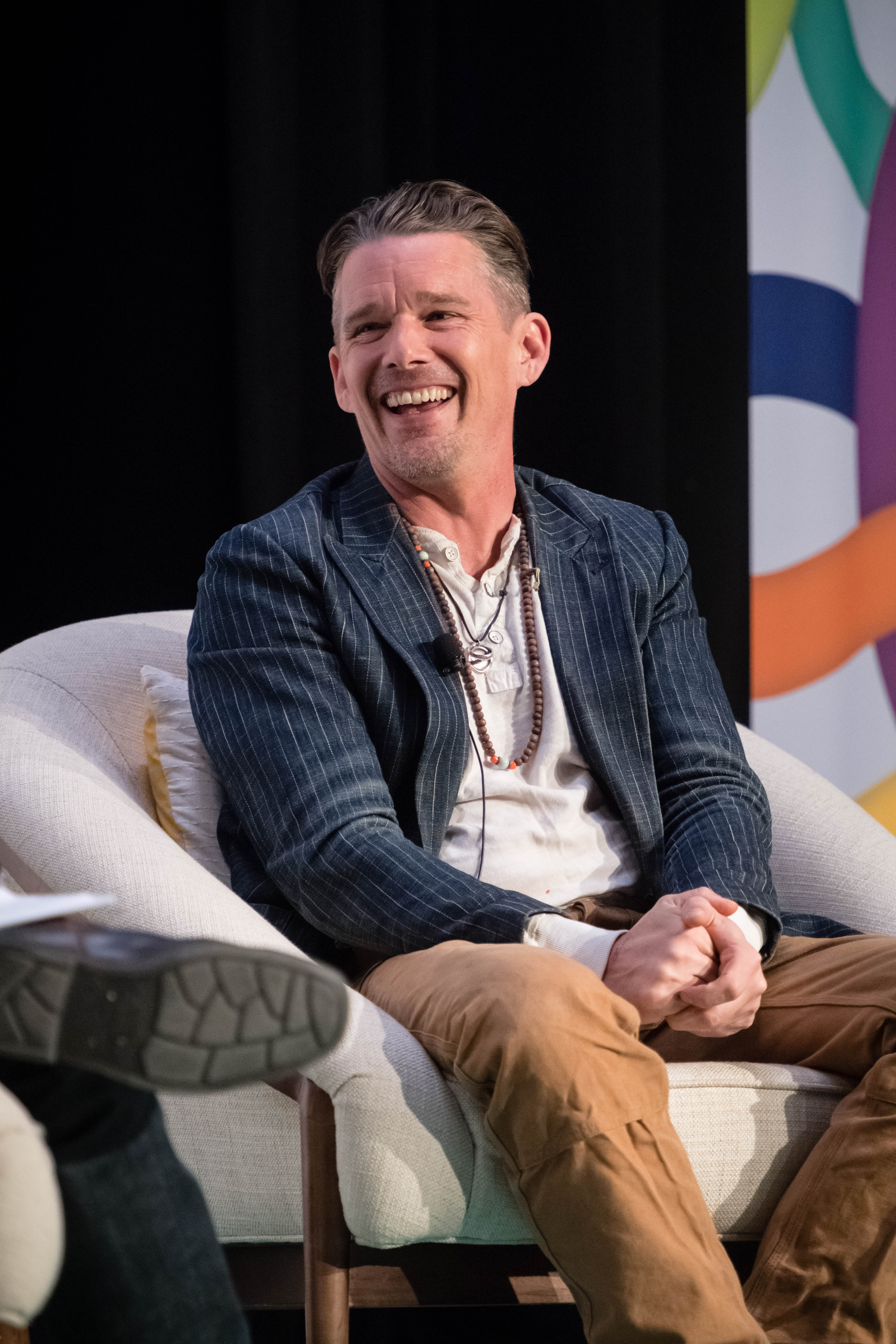
The performances of Sally Hawkins & Ethan Hawke received praise from critics.

In Variety, Peter Debruge said the Lewis character stood out for "indefatigable optimism", despite living conditions given her gruff husband and small home. The Hollywood Reporter critic Todd McCarthy commended the photography and Hawkins for "A stellar, warmly persuasive starring turn". Jordan Hoffman rated it three stars in The Guardian, predicting Hawkins would attract much notice for her performance. The New York Times critic Manohla Dargis wrote Maudie overcame viewer skepticism, and cited Hawkins for bringing Lewis out. Alan Scherstuhl, writing for Village Voice, assessed it as "hit-or-miss" but a tear-jerker, praising Hawkins in particular. The A.V. Club's Ignatiy Vishnevetsky said the film lost its momentum in character development over the runtime.

In Canada, Kate Taylor, writing for The Globe and Mail, gave the film three stars, crediting Walsh for making the story moving but not mawkish, for not dwelling on Lewis' physical condition and for communicating the significance of making art. Chris Knight awarded it three and a half stars in the National Post, commending Hawke for a "committed yet unshowy performance". The Toronto Star's Peter Howell gave it three stars, declaring it "award-worthy" and praising Hawkins for "dignity and determination". Luc Boulanger gave it three stars in La Presse, saluting Hawkins and expressing regret Lewis' art was obscure in Quebec. In Ireland, Donald Clarke called it a "wonderful study" in The Irish Times, finding the tone sad and remarking on poverty as subject matter, but said it displayed "benevolence and quiet humanism", and gave it four of five stars. The Irish Independent's Paul Whitington wrote "Maudie cleverly avoids mawkishness and sentiment to give us a raw and pared back version of Lewis's remarkable life".

=== Accolades ===
At the 2016 Vancouver International Film Festival, where Maudie was the opening gala, it won the Super Channel People's Choice Award, the top audience award at the festival for feature films. At the 6th Canadian Screen Awards, it received seven nominations, among the five films to receive the most nominations with eight or seven each.

Award	Date of ceremony	Category	Recipient(s)	Result	Ref(s)
ACTRA Awards	25 February 2017	Outstanding Female Performance	Kari Matchett	Nominated	
Atlantic Film Festival	15–22 September 2016	Best Atlantic Feature	Aisling Walsh	Won	
Atlantic Film Festival	15–22 September 2016	Best Atlantic Screenwriting	Sherry White	Won	
Canadian Screen Awards	11 March 2018	Best Motion Picture	Bob Cooper, Mary Young Leckie, Mary Sexton, Susan Mullen	Won	
Canadian Screen Awards	11 March 2018	Best Director	Aisling Walsh	Won	
Canadian Screen Awards	11 March 2018	Best Original Screenplay	Sherry White	Won	
Canadian Screen Awards	11 March 2018	Best Actress	Sally Hawkins	Won	
Canadian Screen Awards	11 March 2018	Best Supporting Actor	Ethan Hawke	Won	
Canadian Screen Awards	11 March 2018	Best Editing	Stephen O'Connell	Won	
Canadian Screen Awards	11 March 2018	Best Costume Design	Trysha Bakker	Won	
Canadian Society of Cinematographers	1 April 2017	Theatrical Feature Cinematography	Guy Godfree	Won	
Cinéfest Sudbury International Film Festival	17–25 September 2016	Best Feature Film	Aisling Walsh	Won	
Irish Film & Television Awards	15 February 2018	Best Film	Aisling Walsh	Nominated	
Irish Film & Television Awards	15 February 2018	Best Director	Aisling Walsh	Won	
Irish Film & Television Awards	15 February 2018	Best International Actor	Ethan Hawke	Won	
Irish Film & Television Awards	15 February 2018	Best International Actress	Sally Hawkins	Nominated	
Irish Film & Television Awards	15 February 2018	Best Production Design	John Hand	Won	
Irish Film & Television Awards	15 February 2018	Best Sound	Marco Dolle, Steve Munro, Garret Farrell	Nominated	
London Film Critics' Circle	28 January 2018	British Actress of the Year	Sally Hawkins	Won (Note: Also for The Shape of Water and Paddington 2)	
Montclair Film Festival	May 2017	Audience Award	Aisling Walsh	Won	
National Society of Film Critics	6 January 2018	Best Actress	Sally Hawkins	Won (Note: Also for The Shape of Water)	
San Diego Film Critics Society	11 December 2017	Best Actress	Sally Hawkins	Won	
San Diego Film Critics Society	11 December 2017	Best Supporting Actor	Ethan Hawke	Nominated	
Vancouver International Film Festival	29 September–14 October 2016	People's Choice Award	Aisling Walsh	Won	
Women's Image Network Awards	February 2018	Best Film Directed by a Woman	Aisling Walsh	Nominated	
Women's Image Network Awards	February 2018	Best Feature Film	Aisling Walsh	Won	
Women's Image Network Awards	February 2018	Best Feature Film Actress	Sally Hawkins	Nominated	
Writers Guild of Canada	24 April 2017	WGC Award	Sherry White	Won	

== Impact ==
During the 2017 Nova Scotia election campaign, CTV News anchor Steve Murphy asked Premier Stephen McNeil if he rued the reduction of the film credit after Maudie moved to Newfoundland. McNeil replied the production had already moved by the time the decision was made.

The film stimulated a resurgence of interest in Lewis' work, with Consignor Art in Toronto moving her painting Three Black Cats to more prominent exhibition space in spring 2017 and reporting great attendance. The Art Gallery of Nova Scotia reported 3,134 people came to see Lewis' work and house, relocated there, between March and the beginning of May, an increase from 2,084 the prior year. An Ontario charity auction for a Lewis painting sold for $45,000, surpassing the most previously paid for a Lewis painting, $22,000 in 2009, while Portrait of Eddie Barnes and Ed Murphy, Lobster Fisherman, Bay View, Nova Scotia, estimated to be worth $16,000, sold for more than double. After the theatrical release, prints of London, Ontario artist William Johnson's 1969 portrait of Everett Lewis, Maudie's Window, were also sent to Museum London. Lewis' biographer Lance Woolaver has seen an increase in sales of his book Maud Lewis: The Heart on the Door.
