= Tales of Two Who Dreamt =

2016 Canadian film

- Spanish: Historias de dos que soñaron
- Directed by: Nicolás Pereda; Andrea Bussmann
- Written by: Nicolás Pereda; Andrea Bussmann
- Produced by: Nicolás Pereda; Andrea Bussmann; Daniel Montgomery
- Cinematography: Andrea Bussmann; Noé Rodriguez
- Edited by: Andrea Bussmann
- Production companies: Medium Density Fibreboard Films; Interior13 Cine
- Release date: February 26, 2016 (Berlin)
- Running time: 85 minutes
- Countries: Canada; Mexico
- Language: Hungarian

Tales of Two Who Dreamt (Spanish: Historias de dos que soñaron) is a Canadian documentary film, directed by Nicolás Pereda and Andrea Bussmann and released in 2016. The film centres on the Laskas, a Roma family of immigrants from Hungary to Canada, who are preparing for their immigration hearing.

The film premiered at the 2016 Berlin Film Festival, and had its Canadian premiere at the 2016 Vancouver International Film Festival.
