= Lance Woolaver =

Canadian author, poet, playwright, lyricist and director

Lance Gerard Woolaver
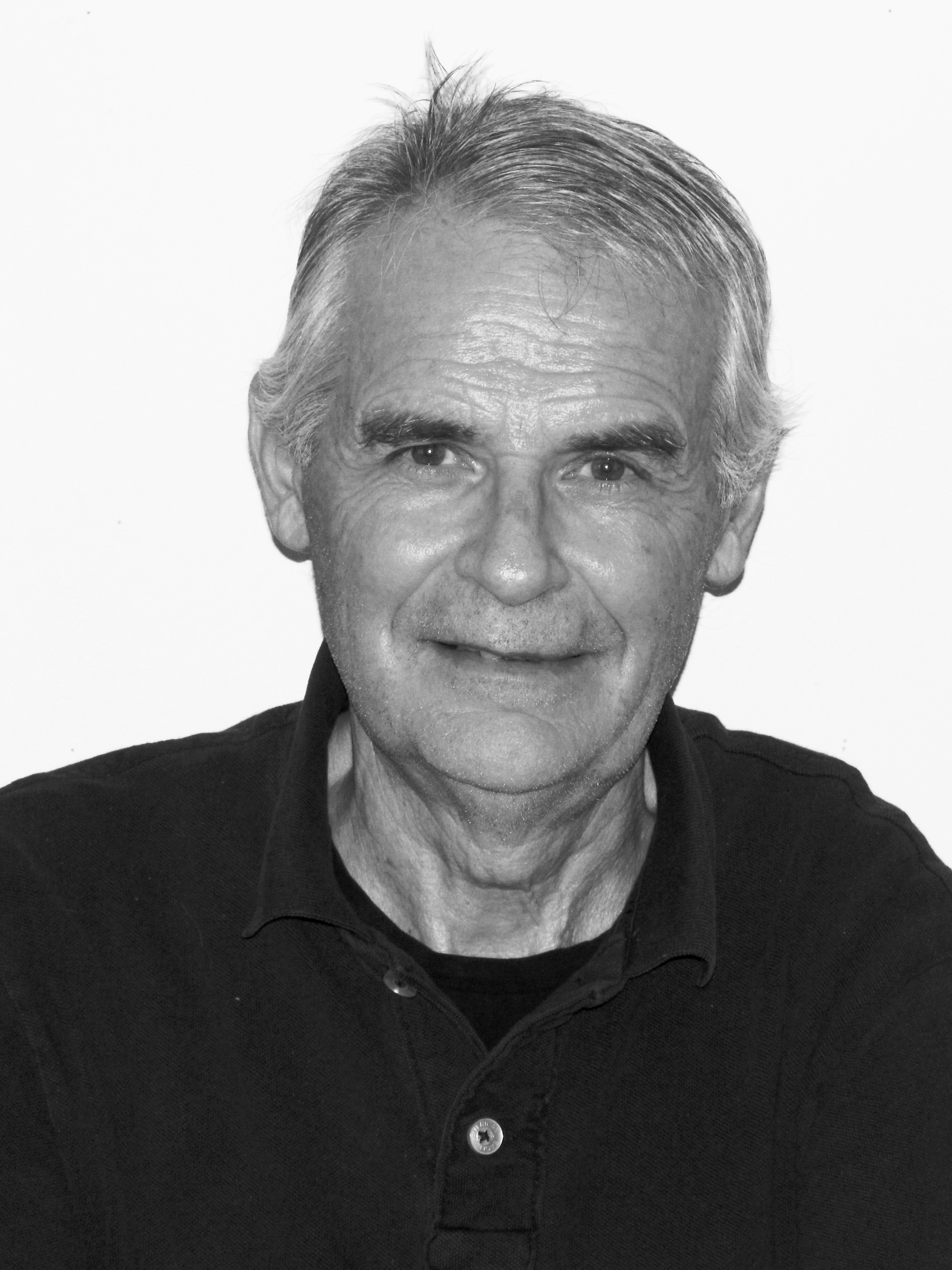
- Born: Digby County, Nova Scotia
- Education: Acadia, Dalhousie, The Sorbonne
- Occupation: Writer
- Spouse: Martha (Spencer)
- Children: Shirley; Lance
- Writing career
- Language: English
- Genres: History, Children's Books
- Subjects: Maud Lewis, Portia White, Evelyn Richardson
- Notable works: The Illuminated Life of Maud Lewis; Maud Lewis - World Without Shadows; Maud Lewis The Heart on the Door
- Website: lancewoolaver.ca -->

Lance Gerard Woolaver (born 1948) is a Canadian author, poet, playwright, lyricist, and director. His best-known works include books, film and biographical plays about Canadian folk artist Maud Lewis, including Maud Lewis The Heart on the Door, and Maud Lewis - World Without Shadows. His plays include one about international singer Portia White, who was born in Nova Scotia: Portia White - First You Dream.

== Biography ==
=== Early life ===
Woolaver was born in Digby County, Nova Scotia, in 1948. He attended Acadia and Dalhousie universities in Nova Scotia, and the Sorbonne in Paris.

As a child, Woolaver had seen Maud and Everett Lewis, and their tiny painted house. He noticed tourists stopping to buy paintings, but kept his distance from these local characters. However, he was later inspired to pitch an article on Maud Lewis to Chatelaine magazine. The article was accepted on the condition that Woolaver co-write it with a female author. He wrote with his mother, and the resulting article, "The Joyful Art of Maud Lewis," published in December 1975, was purchased for $700, a sum he considered "a fortune" at the time. This enabled and encouraged him to devote time to writing. He later wrote a book and two plays about Maud Lewis.

Woolaver published earlier stories in the 1970s in Canadian literary magazines, including the Wascana Review (which ceased publication in 2012) and The Fiddlehead.

=== Marriage and family ===
Woolaver lives in Halifax with his wife, Martha (Spencer) of Saskatoon. They married in 1967, and have two children, and two grandchildren. Woolaver enjoys flyfishing in the Canadian Rockies, and on the Margaree River in Cape Breton Island.

== Literary career ==
Woolaver wrote the book The Illuminated Life of Maud Lewis (1996), with photographs by Bob Brooks. It was awarded the Dartmouth Book Award and the Atlantic Booksellers Award. It was adapted as a film of the same name (with screenplay by Woolaver) that aired on Canadian VisionTV in 1998. The film was directed by Peter d'Entremont and produced by Triad Film Productions and the National Film Board of Canada.

Woolaver's play Maud Lewis - World Without Shadows has been produced by professional and community theatres, including Neptune Theatre (Halifax), King’s Theatre of Annapolis Royal and Ship’s Company Theatre of Parrsboro in Nova Scotia, and the Blyth Festival of Ontario. It was also adapted and produced as a CBC Radio national broadcast.

His play The Poor Farm, was produced at the Chester Playhouse under the direction of Christopher Heide of Mahone Bay. It was the first play in Nova Scotia to engage actors of Mi’kmaq, White, Black and Acadian heritage in the same production. It dealt with the politics of poverty and the system of provincial poor farms.

Woolaver's collection of Christmas songs, The Noel Cantata, was recently produced in Norway.

His young adult novel The Outlaw League (1991) was adapted for film, and he wrote the screenplay. Based in his hometown, it was shot in Restigouche, New Brunswick. It was produced in Montreal as La Gang des Hors la Loi; it won the Vancouver Reel to Real Film Festival in 2015.

His play Portia White - First You Dream, about Portia White, a Nova Scotia native and Canada's first black singer to win international acclaim, has been produced by several theaters, including the Victoria Playhouse in Petrolia, Ontario.

His newest novel, The Halflife of Evil, will be published by Spencer Books in June 2018. It is about Maud Lewis, the provincial Poor Farm, and the policies of imprisonment of the poor.

=== Maud Lewis ===
Woolaver is best known for his works on the life and art of Maud Lewis. He wrote a picture book of Maud’s life, The Illuminated Life of Maud Lewis (1996), with photographs of Maud and her works by Bob Brooks. It has been in continuous print since being published. The cover image of Maud Lewis in the sunny corner of her tiny house has been recognized as a classic portrait, said to rank with the work of Yousuf Karsh.

Maud Lewis - World Without Shadows, his play about Maud Lewis and her husband Everett Lewis, has been produced across Canada and broadcast by CBC radio. It tells of Maud’s struggle against juvenile rheumatoid arthritis, and triumph as an artist, despite poverty. Canadian actor Nicola Lipman played Maud to great acclaim in the 1990s Ship’s Company Theatre and Neptune Theatre productions.

His play The Return of Her Child deals with issues related to the adoption of Maud Lewis's daughter Catherine by Mamie Crosby.

Woolaver's recent full biography, Maud Lewis The Heart on the Door (2016), features another Brooks' portrait of the artist, taken in 1965, in which Lewis appears frightened and fearful. This is appropriate to the darker tone of this work, as Woolaver explores many issues in her life. His account contrasts also with the portrayal of Lewis in the independent feature drama film, Maudie.

=== The Outlaw League / La Gang des Hors la Loi ===
The Outlaw League (1991) is a young adult novel, which Woolaver set in his home town of Digby, Nova Scotia. It explores the role of baseball in bringing the people of the village together. Woolaver refers to childhood friends in his book, and to former Digby baseball teams, including the Digby Ravens, the Bear River Blue Sox, and the Freeport Schooners.

The novel was adapted as a 2014 film, La Gang des Hors la Loi, produced by Rock Demers of Productions La Fete, from a script by André Melançon, Jean Beaudry, and Woolaver.

== Honours and awards ==
- 2003, Maud Lewis - World Without Shadows won the Merritt Award as Nova Scotia’s outstanding play.

=== Books ===
Woolaver wrote the following:

- Maud Lewis The Heart on the Door (2016), Spencer Books, ISBN 978-0-9950017-0-1
- The Poor Farm (1999), Charles Press, ISBN 978-0-9685606-0-0
- with Bob Brooks, photographer. Maud's Country : Landscapes that Inspired the Art of Maud Lewis (1999), Nimbus Publishing, ISBN 978-1-55109-314-7 |oclc=40534718
- with Bob Brooks, photographer. Christmas with Maud Lewis (1997), Goose Lane Editions, ISBN 978-0-86492-189-5 |oclc=37491578
- with Bob Brooks, and Art Gallery of Nova Scotia. The Illuminated Life of Maud Lewis (1996), Nimbus Publishing, ISBN 978-1-55109-176-1 |oclc=37519347
- with George Dillon Woolaver. Lance Gerard Woolaver's World Without Shadows (1996), Stage Hand, ISBN 978-1-896161-09-9 |oclc=35942224
- with John Burden. The Outlaw League (1991), Nimbus Publishing, ISBN 978-0-921054-71-9 |oclc=22812322
- The Metallic Sparrow (1991), Nimbus Publishing, ISBN 978-1-55109-033-7 |oclc=26852160
- with Anna Gamble. Change of Tide (1982), Nimbus Publishing, ISBN 978-0-920852-18-7 |oclc=158998785
- with Maud Lewis. Christmas with the Rural Mail : a poem (1979), Nimbus Publishing, ISBN 978-0-920852-04-0 |oclc=9750720
- with Maud Lewis. From Ben Loman to the Sea : a poem (1979), Nimbus Publishing, ISBN 978-0-920852-05-7 |oclc=10707547

=== Plays ===
His plays include the following:

- Brindley Town : a two-hander in three acts (2000), Gaspereau Press, Wolfville, NS
- The Poor Farm
- Lord Strange
- Maud Lewis - World Without Shadows (1996)
- Portia White - First You Dream
- Evelyn Richardson - The Keeping of Lights
- Kenny Paul

=== Children's books ===
His children's books include the following:

- Duck, Duck and Duck
- The Humble Mumbles
- Christmas with the Rural Mail
- From Ben Loman to the Sea
- with Anna Gamble, Change of Tide '
- with Lee Tanner, Mr. Christmas
- with Lee Tanner, Darwin

=== Libretto ===
The Heart on the Door

=== Songs ===
Noel Cantata, with Notteroy Church, Norway

=== Scripts ===
His film screenplays and radio scripts include the following:

- The Poor Farms, Radio Documentary (with Ron Foley MacDonald)
- The Illuminated Life of Maud Lewis (1998)
- Maud Lewis - The Heart on the Door
- The Outlaw League (produced as La Gang des Hors-la-Loi)
- The Noggins
