= Summer of Goliath =

2010 Canadian-Mexican-Dutch film

- Spanish: Verano de Goliat
- Directed by: Nicolás Pereda
- Screenplay by: Nicolás Pereda
- Cinematography: Alejandro Coronado
- Edited by: Nicolás Pereda
- Release date: 2010
- Language: Spanish

Summer of Goliath (Spanish: Verano de Goliat) is a 2010 Canadian-Mexican-Dutch drama film written and directed by Nicolás Pereda.

A hybrid between fiction and documentary, the film won the Orizzonti competition at the 67th edition of the Venice Film Festival.

== Cast ==
- Clemencia Alejo as Clemen
- Jose Refugio as Cuco
- Silvia Alejo as Tendera
- Gabriela Alejo as Hija de tendera
