= Fauna (film) =

- Film poster
- Spanish: Flora y fauna
- Directed by: Nicolás Pereda
- Written by: Nicolás Pereda
- Produced by: Nicolás Pereda
- Starring: Lázaro Gabino Rodriguez; Luisa Pardo; Francisco Barreiro; Teresita Sánchez
- Cinematography: Mariel Baqueiro
- Edited by: Nicolás Pereda
- Production company: Producciones En Chinga
- Release date: September 16, 2020 (TIFF)
- Countries: Canada; Mexico
- Language: Spanish

Fauna (Spanish: Flora y fauna) is a 2020 Mexican-Canadian drama film, directed by Nicolás Pereda. An exploration of the impact of "narco" culture on Mexican society, the film stars Luisa Pardo and Francisco Barreiro as Luisa and Paco, a couple who are travelling to visit her parents when they are reunited with Luisa's estranged brother Gabino (Lázaro Gabino Rodríguez).

An excerpt from the film was screened as part of the "Works in Progress" section of the Los Cabos International Film Festival in 2019, and won the Cinecolor Mexico Award. The completed film premiered at the 2020 Toronto International Film Festival, where it received an honorable mention from the jury for the Amplify Voices award for Best Canadian Film.

The film was named to TIFF's year-end Canada's Top Ten list for feature films.
