= Where Are Their Stories? =

- Spanish: ¿Dónde están sus historias?
- Directed by: Nicolás Pereda
- Written by: Nicolás Pereda
- Produced by: Catalina Pereda
- Starring: Teresa Sánchez; Gabino Rodríguez; Clarisa Malheiros; Juana Rodríguez
- Cinematography: Alejandro Coronado
- Edited by: Nicolás Pereda
- Release date: 2007
- Running time: 73 minutes
- Countries: Mexico; Canada
- Language: Spanish

Where Are Their Stories? (Spanish: ¿Dónde están sus historias?) is a 2007 film directed by Mexican-Canadian filmmaker Nicolás Pereda. The plot is about a young man, Gabino, who travels to Mexico City to save his grandmother's farm from being sold by relatives from the north. In the process, he reunites with his mother, who works as a maid in a middle-class household.
