= The Killing$ of Tony Blair =

- Directed by: Sanne van den Bergh, Greg Ward
- Produced by: George Galloway
- Release date: 27 July 2016 (UK)
- Country: United Kingdom
- Language: English
- Budget: £164,000
- Box office: £17,730 (by 15 August 2016)

The Killing$ of Tony Blair is a documentary film presented and narrated by George Galloway (who also produced) and co-directed by Sanne van den Bergh and Greg Ward.

The film was released, theatrically, in the UK on 27 July 2016. The DVD and download followed on 15 August.

== Proposal ==
In August 2013, Galloway announced his intention to make a documentary film under the original title of The Killing of Tony Blair to be financed by on-line public subscription raised via the crowdfunding site Kickstarter. With a title chosen for "shock value", the film concerns Blair's alleged destruction of the Labour Party, the hundreds of thousands of civilians who died during the Iraq War, and the former Prime Minister's well-remunerated business interests and relationship with the bank JP Morgan and Middle East dictators since he left office in 2007; in Galloway's view, a third "killing". In the Kickstarter promotional video, Galloway expressed the hope that his actions would lead to pressure on Blair, stating: "It will take him all [the way] to The Hague, to a war crimes trial and to the slamming of a cell door shut behind him." He promised to "uncover some startling new truths" about Blair.

The documentary film-maker Greg Ward was originally announced as the co-director of the project with Galloway, and the film was intended to be released globally. The Kickstarter campaign was set up with the target of raising £50,000, but by the time it ended, more than three times this amount had been raised through donations - £164,000.

== Reception ==
On the review aggregator website Rotten Tomatoes, 73% of 11 critics' reviews are positive. Henry Barnes of The Guardian has written that the claims for the project made by Galloway, "a good friend of hyperbole", do not match the content of the final film. It is, however, "an entertaining ramble through well-publicised allegations and a slick run down the rap sheet for those who need a reminder of Tony’s avarice".

Dave Calhoun of Time Out described the film as a "surprisingly sober documentary about our former Prime Minister's dirty dealings". Alexa Dalby of independent film magazine Dog and Wolf wrote that "this accessible and well-made film makes excellent use of archive footage" and is "wide ranging enough to cleverly flesh out the recent history even if it has no startlingly new information to add". It is though "totally one-sided", according to Dalby. According to Geoffrey MacNab, writing for The Independent in July 2016, "Galloway has assembled a formidable list of witnesses for the prosecution", but MacNab added "one of the weaknesses here is that there is nobody to argue Blair’s case".

Jeremy Aspinall, writing for the Radio Times, described Galloway as a "Michael Moore style investigator" who was "an urgent, entertaining, and yes, abrasive inquisitor".

Allan Hunter, of the Daily Express, called the film "a partisan documentary in which Galloway provides an entertaining commentary on the many sins of the former prime minister", before concluding that "all the accusations may be familiar but the cumulative effect is depressing in the extreme".

"It is a meticulous documentation of Blair’s odious, immoral and almost unbelievable money-grubbing-from-despots venality", wrote Rod Liddle in an almost entirely positive review in The Spectator. "Galloway is a terrific presenter, dapper in his left-wing hat, all boilerplate rhetoric, biblical quotations and growled sardonic asides". Wendy Ide wrote for The Observer: "While there is no doubt that Blair should be called to account, Galloway’s lack of credibility and air of insufferable sanctimony have the unexpected result of making you want to side with Blair". Yohann Koshy for Vice magazine commented: "There's a tension between [Blair] as a malicious individual, obsessed with money and power, and a cipher for all that's calamitous with life in the early 21st century – Galloway ends the film by saying, after all that, that Blair is 'just a symptom'. But if Blair's guilty of everything, as the film suggests, then he's guilty of nothing".

== Box office ==
The film was officially released on 27 July 2016 with a limited nationwide release across predominantly independent cinemas. By the third week in August 2016, the film had grossed just £17,730.
