= Maud Lewis =

Nova Scotian folk artist

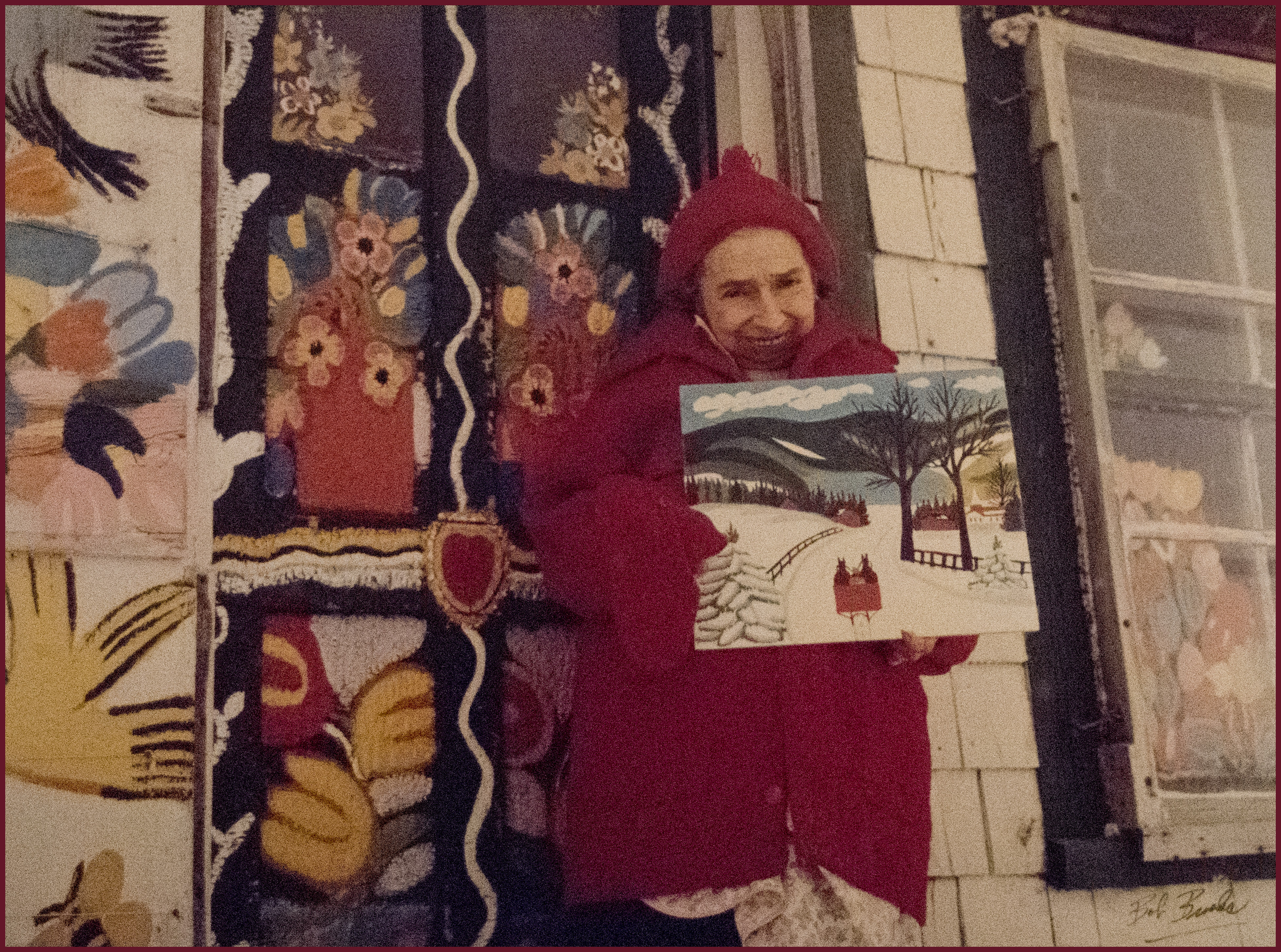
- Lewis in front of her home
- Born: Maud Kathleen Dowley; March 7, 1903; South Ohio, Nova Scotia, Canada
- Died: July 30, 1970 (aged 67); Digby, Nova Scotia, Canada
- Resting place: North Range Cemetery, Digby, Nova Scotia, Canada
- Known for: Painting
- Style: Folk art
- Spouse: Everett Lewis
- Children: Catherine Dowley

Maud Kathleen Lewis (née Dowley; March 7, 1903 – July 30, 1970) was a Canadian folk artist from Nova Scotia. She lived most of her life in poverty in a tiny house in Marshalltown, Nova Scotia. She achieved national recognition in 1964 and 1965 for her cheerful paintings of landscapes, animals and flowers, which offer a nostalgic and optimistic vision of her native province. Several books, plays and films have been produced about her. She remains one of Canada's most celebrated folk artists. Her works are displayed at the Art Gallery of Nova Scotia, as well as her restored house, whose walls she adorned with her art. Despite her recognition, Lewis never had a museum exhibition, nor was her work collected by art galleries or museums during her lifetime.

== Early life ==
Lewis was born in South Ohio, Nova Scotia, the daughter of John and Agnes (Germain) Dowley. She had one brother, Charles. She was born with birth defects and ultimately developed rheumatoid arthritis, which reduced her mobility, especially in her hands. Lewis' father was a blacksmith and harness maker who owned a harness shop in Yarmouth, Nova Scotia. His business enabled Lewis to enjoy a middle-class childhood. She was introduced to art by her mother, who instructed her in the making of watercolour Christmas cards to sell. Lewis began her artistic career by selling hand-drawn and painted Christmas cards.

Lewis gave birth to a daughter named Catherine Dowley in 1928 who was given up for adoption by Lewis' brother, over fears of the possible societal consequences to the family of having a child born out of wedlock and doubts of his sister's ability to raise a child. Lewis was led to believe that her baby died. Her daughter made attempts to connect with her later in life, but Lewis clung to the belief that her child had died and never acknowledged her.

Lewis' father John died in 1935, and her mother followed him in 1937. After living with her brother for a short while, she moved to Digby, Nova Scotia, to live with her aunt.

== Marriage ==
Maud Dowley married Everett Lewis, a fish peddler from Marshalltown, on January 16, 1938, at the age of 34. He also worked as the watchman at the county Poor Farm. According to Everett, Maud showed up at his doorstep in response to an ad he had posted in the local stores for a "live-in or keep house" for a 40-year-old bachelor. Several weeks later, they married.

They lived in Everett's one-room house with a sleeping loft, in Marshalltown, a few miles west of Digby. Maud used the house as her studio, while Everett took care of the housework. They lived mostly in poverty.

Maud Lewis accompanied her husband on his daily rounds peddling fish door-to-door, bringing along Christmas cards she had painted. She sold the cards for five cents each, the same price her mother had charged for the cards she had made when Maud was a girl. These cards proved popular with her husband's customers. When Everett was hired as a night watchman at the neighbouring Poor Farm in 1939, Lewis began selling her Christmas cards and paintings directly from their home. Everett encouraged Lewis to paint, and he bought her her first set of oils.

She expanded her range, using other surfaces for painting, such as pulp boards (beaverboards), cookie sheets, and Masonite. Lewis was a prolific artist and also painted on more or less every available surface in their tiny home: walls, doors, breadboxes, and even the stove. She completely covered the simple patterned commercial wallpaper with sinewy stems, leaves, and blossoms.

== Paintings ==
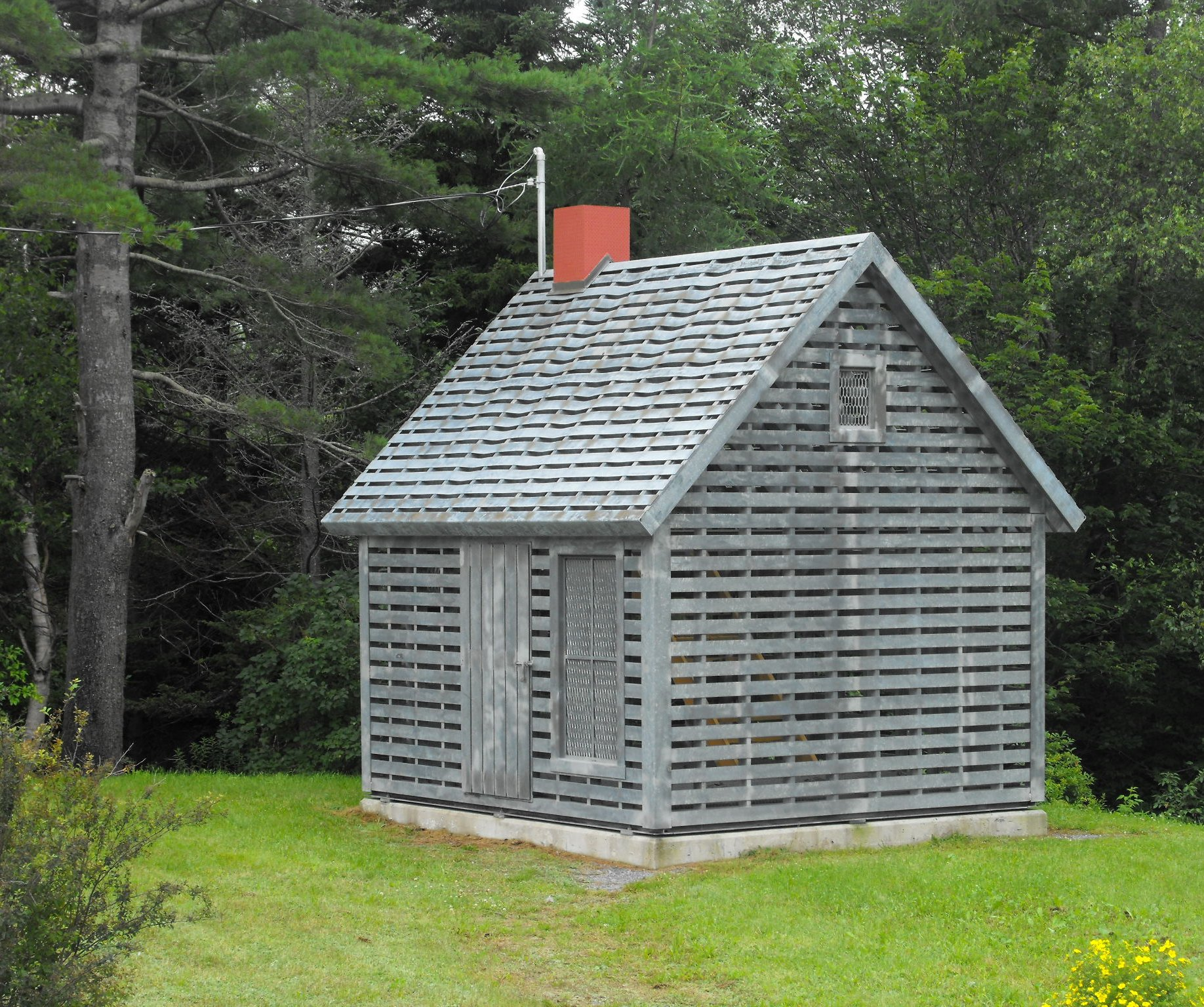
Maud Lewis Memorial in Marshalltown

Lewis used bright colours in her paintings, and her subjects were often flowers or animals, including oxen teams, horses, birds, deer, and cats. Many of her paintings are of outdoor scenes, including Cape Island boats bobbing on the water, horses pulling a sleigh, skaters, and portraits of dogs, cats, deer, birds, and cows. Her paintings were inspired by childhood memories of the landscape and people around Yarmouth and South Ohio, as well as Digby locations such as Point Prim and Bayview. Commercial Christmas cards and calendars also influenced her.

Lewis returned to the same subjects again and again, each time painting them slightly differently. For instance, she made dozens, if not hundreds, of images of cats over the course of her career. The serial nature of her practice was partly motivated by customer demand; she repeated compositions that sold well while discarding less popular ones. "I put the same things in, I never change," she said of her style on the CBC program Telescope in 1965. "Same colours and same designs."

Many of her paintings are quite small, no larger than eight by ten inches, although she is known to have done at least five paintings that are 24 inches by 36 inches. For several years, Everett cut the boards for the paintings to size, although near the end of her career she was purchasing Masonite pre-cut to set dimensions. The size of her paintings was limited by the extent she could move her arms, which were affected by arthritis. She used mostly wallboard and tubes of Tinsol, an oil-based paint. Her technique consisted of first coating the board with white, then drawing an outline, and applying paint directly out of the tube. She never blended or mixed colours.

Early Maud Lewis paintings from the 1940s are quite rare. A large collection of Lewis' work can be found in the Art Gallery of Nova Scotia (AGNS). It occasionally displays the Chaplin/Wennerstrom shutters (now part of the Clearwater Fine Foods Inc. collection) comprising 22 exterior house shutters Lewis painted in the early 1940s for some Americans who owned a cottage on the South Shore. Most of the shutters are quite large, at 5 ft x 1 ft.6 inches. Lewis was paid 70 cents a shutter.

Between 1945 and 1950, people began to stop at Lewis' Marshalltown home on Highway No. 1, Nova Scotia's main highway and tourist route, buying her paintings for two or three dollars each. Only in the last three or four years of her life did Lewis' paintings begin to sell for seven to ten dollars. She achieved national attention as a folk artist following an article in the Toronto-based Star Weekly in 1964. In 1965, she was featured on CBC-TV's Telescope. Two of Lewis' paintings were ordered by the White House in the 1970s during Richard Nixon's presidency. Her arthritis limited her ability to complete many of the orders that resulted from her national recognition.

== Later life and death ==
In the last year of her life, Lewis stayed in one corner of her house, painting as often as she could while traveling back and forth to the hospital for treatment of health issues. She died in Digby on July 30, 1970, from pneumonia and her gravesite is there. Her husband Everett was killed in 1979 by a burglar during an attempted robbery of the house.

== Legacy ==
=== House ===
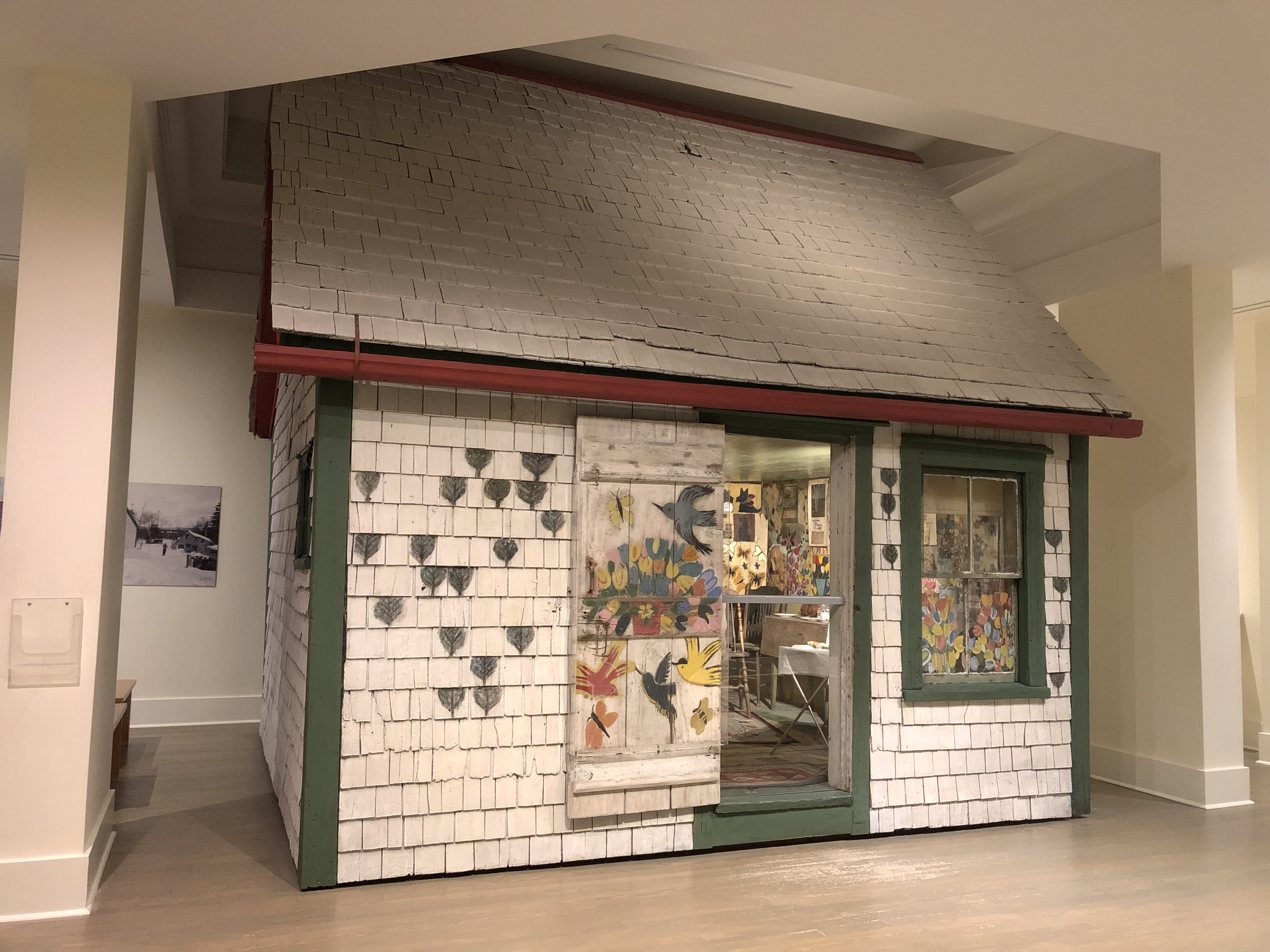
The restored Maud Lewis Home on display at the Art Gallery of Nova Scotia

After Everett Lewis' death, their painted house began to deteriorate. A group of concerned citizens from the Digby area started the Maud Lewis Painted House Society to save the landmark. In 1984, it was sold to the Province of Nova Scotia and transferred to the care of the Art Gallery of Nova Scotia, which restored the house and installed it as part of its permanent Lewis exhibit. This inspiring story helped to sway the provincial and municipal government about the importance of an art museum for the city. Every year, this attraction welcomes thousands of visitors from around the world and depicts her cheerful perseverance even in the face of physical and economic hardships.

A steel memorial sculpture based on the Lewis' house has been erected at the original homesite in Marshalltown, designed by architect Brian MacKay-Lyons. A replica of the Maud Lewis House was built in 1999 by retired fisherman Murray Ross, complete with finished interior. It is a few kilometres north of Marshalltown on the road to Digby Neck in Seabrook.

=== Postage stamps ===
Lewis was recognized as the provincial Heritage Day honouree for 2019, and a limited edition postage stamp featuring her art was released. Canada Post announced that Maud Lewis paintings would be featured on the 2020 Christmas and holiday postage stamps. Her paintings were featured on three stamps issued on November 2, 2020, at Digby, Nova Scotia. Family and Sled (ca. 1960s) appeared on the domestic-rate stamp. Team of Oxen in Winter (1967) was released with a face value of $1.30 (the rate for mail to the United States), and Winter Sleigh Ride (early 1960s) carried a face value of $2.71 (the first-class rate for mail to other international addresses). The stamps were issued as a gummed souvenir sheet set of three, and in three separate booklets of self-adhesive stamps.

=== Paintings sale prices ===
Lewis' paintings have sold at auction for ever increasing prices. On November 30, 2009, A Family Outing sold for C$22,200 at a Bonham's auction in Toronto. Another, A View of Sandy Cove, sold in 2012 for C$20,400. A painting found in 2016 at an Ontario thrift store, Portrait of Eddie Barnes and Ed Murphy, Lobster Fishermen, sold in an online auction for C$45,000. Black Truck, depicting the eponymous vehicle driving on road bordered with flowers, sold at auction in Toronto for C$350,000 in May 2022.

== Further reading and other media ==
The Art Gallery of Nova Scotia published "Our Maud: The Life, Art and Legacy of Maud Lewis" by Ray Cronin in 2017. His Maud Lewis: Life & Work was published by the Art Canada Institute in 2021. Laurie Dalton's "Painted Worlds" which casts an art historical light on Lewis was published in 2022. Cronin's "Nova Scotia Folk Art: An Illustrated Guide" (Nimbus) was published in 2024.

In 1976, the first of three documentaries produced by the National Film Board of Canada was released. Maud Lewis: A World Without Shadows was directed by Diane Beaudry for the NFB's women's unit, Studio D. Later films include The Illuminated Life of Maud Lewis (1998) based on a biography by Lance Woolaver, and I Can Make Art ... Like Maud Lewis (2005). The latter is a short film in which a group of Grade 6 students are inspired by Lewis' work to create their own folk art painting.

In 2009, the Art Gallery of Nova Scotia, in conjunction with Greg Thompson Productions, produced a new play about Lewis at the AGNS. A Happy Heart: The Maud Lewis Story was written and produced by Greg Thompson, who produced Marilyn: Forever Blonde at the AGNS in January 2008. Thompson wrote the one-woman play about Lewis while in Nova Scotia in 2008. It ran until October 25, 2009.

Screenwriter Sherry White wrote Maudie, a highly fictionalized feature dramatic film about Lewis that made its Canadian debut at the 2016 Toronto International Film Festival. Directed by Aisling Walsh, it stars Sally Hawkins as Maud and Ethan Hawke as Everett.

The Russian-Canadian composer Nikolai Korndof (1947–2001) wrote an orchestral piece The Smile of Maud Lewis (1998). It was recorded in a performance for orchestra, conducted by Leslie Dala, and released in 2022.

== See also ==
- Nova Scotia Heritage Day
