= Aisling Walsh =

Irish screenwriter and director (born 1958)

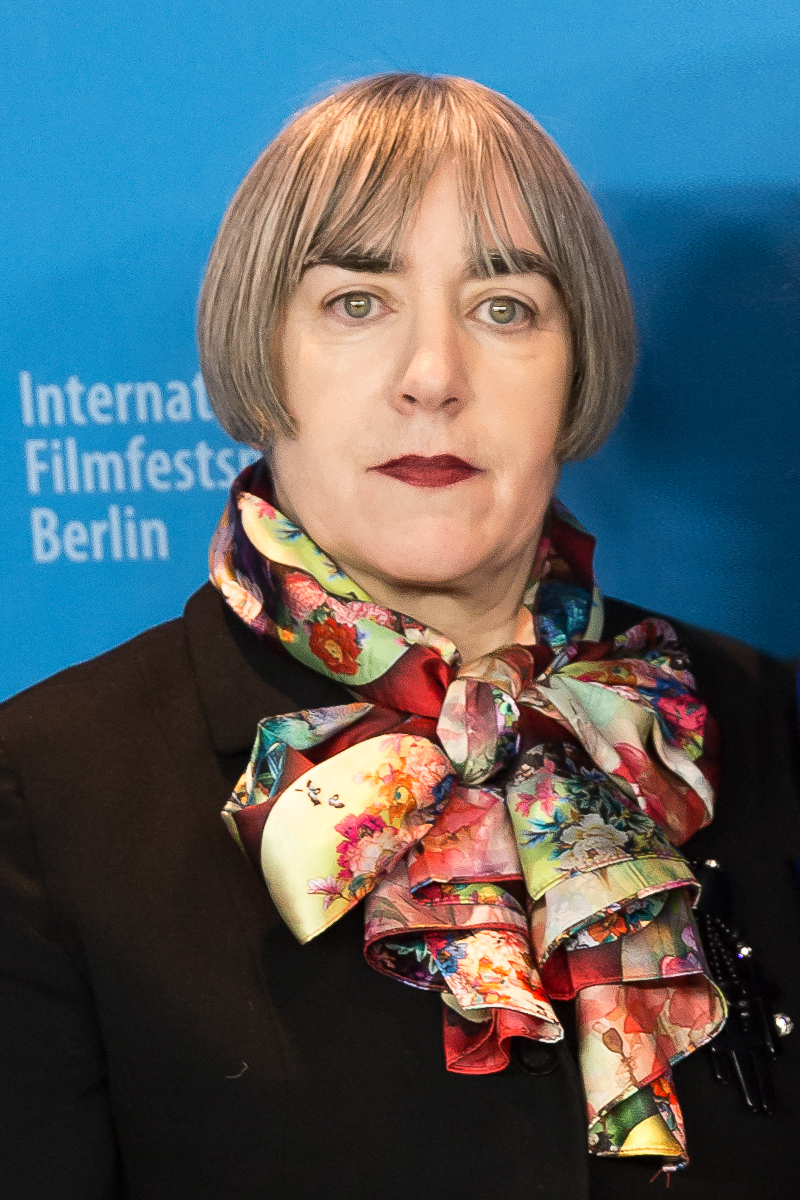
- Walsh at Berlinale in 2017
- Born: September 1958 (age 67–68); Dublin, Ireland
- Education: Dún Laoghaire Institute of Art, Design and Technology
- Occupations: Film director, screenwriter
- Years active: 1985–present
- Spouse: Dermot Ryan (m. 1980; died 2018)

Aisling Walsh (born September 1958) is an Irish screenwriter and director. Her work has screened at festivals around the world and she has won several accolades, including a BAFTA TV Award for Room at the Top (2012) as well as an Irish Film and Television Award and a Canadian Screen Award for her direction of Maudie (2016). She is known for her "unflinching honest portrayals of a Catholic Irish society".

== Early life ==
She was born in Dublin to Raphael Walsh, a furniture designer and manufacturer from Navan, County Meath. In 1975, aged 16, Walsh began studies at the Dún Laoghaire Institute of Art, Design and Technology. She then continued her education at the National Film School in Beaconsfield, England, where one of her main influences was Bill Douglas, a Scottish filmmaker who tutored at the school. She later settled in London.

== Career ==
In 1985, Walsh wrote and directed her first short film, Hostage. Her feature film directorial debut was Joyriders (1989). She then transitioned into television work throughout the 1990s, including episodes of The Bill (1991–1994), Doctor Finlay (1993), Roughnecks (1995), and Trial & Retribution (1997–2002).

In 2003, she wrote and directed her second feature film, Song for a Raggy Boy, which won multiple awards at international film festivals, including Best Film at the Copenhagen International Film Festival. Her third feature, The Daisy Chain, a horror-thriller film, was released in 2008.

Throughout the 2000s and early 2010s, Walsh also continued working in television, directing series and television films such as the BAFTA TV Award-nominated Fingersmith (2005); the BBC One film Sinners (2007); The Fifth Woman, a feature-length episode of the BBC series Wallander, starring Kenneth Branagh (2010); and Room at the Top (2012), which earned her a BAFTA TV Award in 2013 for Best Mini-Series.

In 2014, she directed A Poet in New York, exploring how Welsh poet Dylan Thomas died in New York at the age of 39. The film marked the centenary of Thomas' birth on 27 October 1914.

Her fourth feature film, the biographical film Maudie (2016) about Canadian folk artist Maud Lewis, premiered at the Telluride Film Festival. As someone who studied painting herself, Walsh was drawn to the simplicity and beauty in Lewis's work. The film received positive reviews from critics. The Japan Times called it "an unabashedly intimate portrait of a remarkable woman". It was a New York Times Critic's Pick; in her review, Manohla Dargis criticized the film's tone and score, but commended the performances and direction.

For her work on Maudie, Walsh won a Canadian Screen Award for Best Director; the film won a total of seven awards at the 6th annual ceremony in 2018. Walsh also won the award for Best Director at the 15th annual Irish Film and Television Awards in 2018.

== Filmography ==
=== Film ===
Short film

- Hostage (1985)
- "Invisible State" (2004, segment of Visions of Europe)

Feature film

- Joyriders (1988)
- Song for a Raggy Boy (2003)
- The Daisy Chain (2008)
- Maudie (2016)

=== Television ===
Year	Title	Notes
1991–1994	The Bill	14 episodes
1993	Doctor Finlay	4 episodes
1995	Roughnecks	7 episodes
1995–1996	The Governor	2 episodes
1997–2002	Trial & Retribution	6 episodes
2009	Eadar-Chluich	1 episode
2010	Wallander	1 episode
2025	Miss Austen	4 episodes

TV movies

- Forgive and Forget (2000)
- Little Bird (2000)
- Sinners (2002)
- Loving Miss Hatto (2012)
- A Poet in New York (2014)
- An Inspector Calls (2015)
- Elizabeth is Missing (2019)

Miniseries

- Fingersmith (2005)
- Room at the Top (2012)
