= Marshalltown, Nova Scotia =

Community in Nova Scotia, Canada

Coordinates: 44°34′53.36″N 65°48′6.85″W

Marshalltown in Nova Scotia

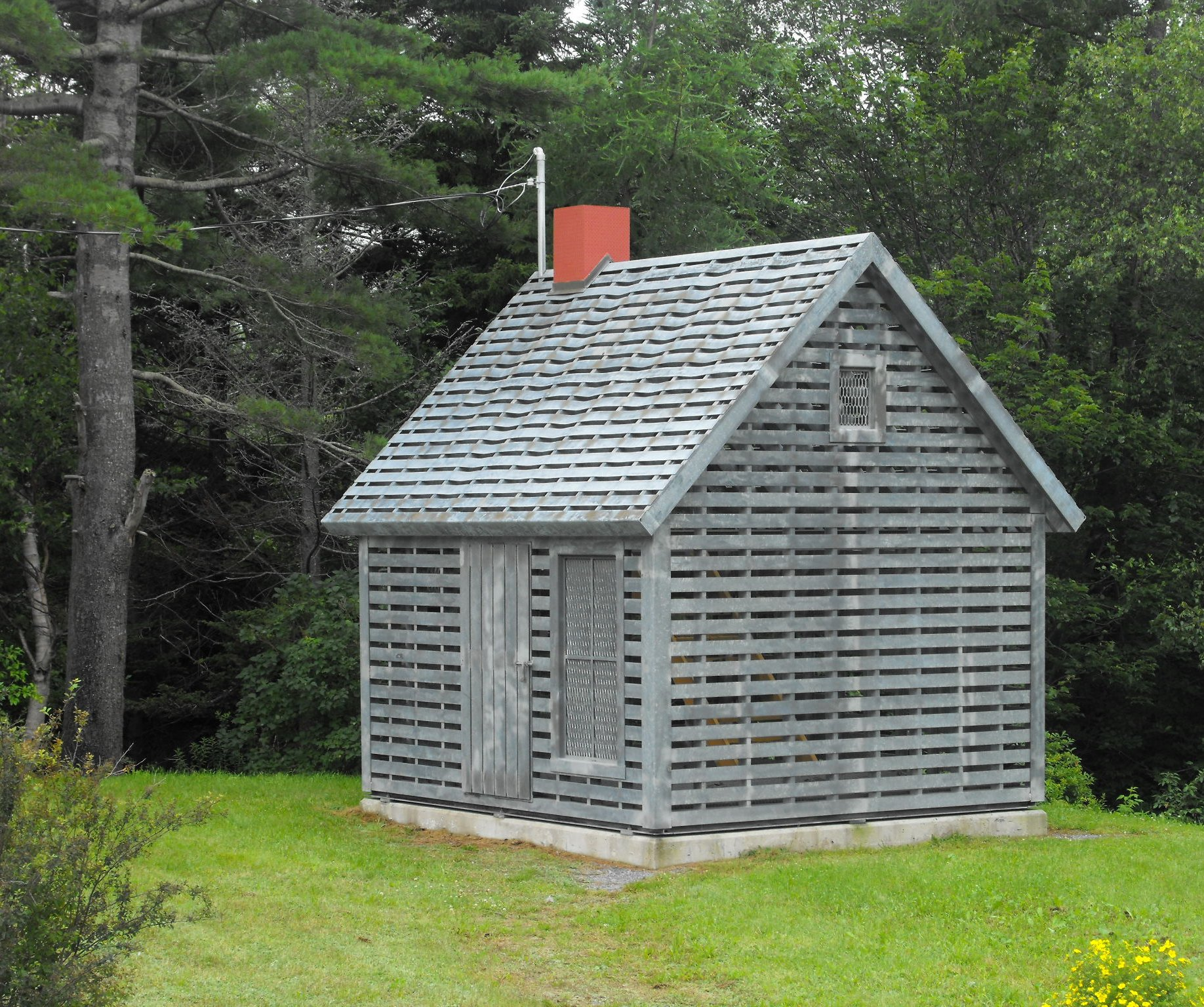
Maude Lewis Memorial in Marshalltown

Marshalltown is a community in the Canadian province of Nova Scotia, located just west of Digby. There was once an almshouse and poor farm. Marshalltown was the birthplace of Samuel Ogden Edison Jr, father of Thomas Edison (1847-1931), and it was also the home of folk artist Maud Lewis (1903-1970) from 1938 until her death. Her small decorated house is preserved at the Art Gallery of Nova Scotia in Halifax while a steel memorial sculpture inspired by the house has been erected at the original site in Marshalltown. A replica of the house and interior is located a few kilometres north of Marshalltown on the road to Digby Neck.
