= Nicolás Pereda =

Mexican-Canadian film director

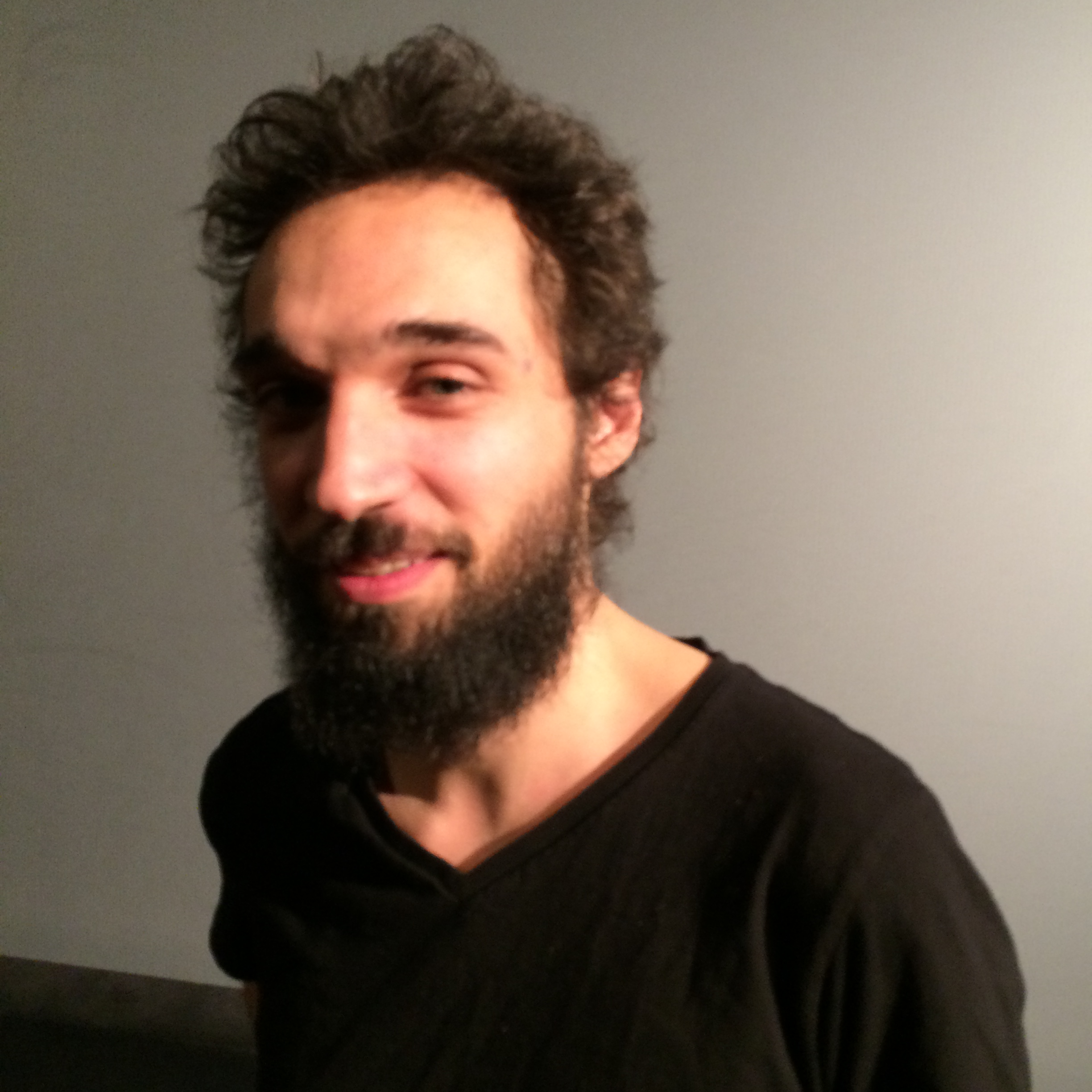
- Pereda at the Berlinale in 2016
- Born: 1982 (age 43–44)
- Occupations: Film director and writer
- Years active: 2000s–present
- Spouse: Andrea Bussmann

Nicolás Pereda (born 1982) is a Mexican Canadian film director. His films regularly blend aspects and techniques of both narrative fiction and documentary filmmaking. His films include Where Are Their Stories? (2007), Summer of Goliath (2010), Tales of Two Who Dreamt (2016), Fauna (2020), Lázaro at Night (2024), Copper (2025), and Everything Else Is Noise (2026).

== Early life ==
Pereda was born in Mexico City in 1982; he holds dual Mexican and Canadian citizenship. He studied filmmaking at York University. He received his Bachelor degree of Fine Arts in Films in 2005 and his Master in 2007.

== Career ==
Pereda's award-winning films include Where Are Their Stories? (2007), Summer of Goliath (2010), Tales of Two Who Dreamt (2016), Fauna (2020), Lázaro at Night (2024), Copper (2025), and Everything Else Is Noise (2026).

Pereda's films, which have been financed by both Mexican and Canadian arts grants and funding bodies, have been predominantly shot in Mexico and are "resolutely Mexican in their intimate attention to class, culture, social structure, and family relations in Mexican society." His work has been described as "meticulous, minimalist, deadpan." His films regularly blend aspects and techniques of both narrative fiction and documentary filmmaking.

His films have been exhibited in festivals around the world, including at the Venice Film Festival, Berlinale, Rotterdam, New York, and the Toronto International Film Festival. Pereda's work has also been presented at several archives, retrospectives, and cinematheques, including the Anthology Film Archives, the Pacific Film Archive, and the Harvard Film Archive, the latter of which wrote of his work: "Pereda’s films are resolutely Mexican in focus and almost exclusively deal with stories drawn directly from the everyday lives and worlds of their working-class characters."

=== Other work ===
Pereda formerly served as the director of the Filmmaking Program, a new BFA program at the Mason Gross School of the Arts at Rutgers University in New Jersey.

== Personal life ==
Pereda is married to film director Andrea Bussmann, with whom he codirected the 2016 film Tales of Two Who Dreamt.

== Awards ==
Pereda has won several awards for his filmmaking work, including the $10,000 Jay Scott Prize from the Toronto Film Critics Association in 2013, and an honorable mention from the jury for the Amplify Voices Award for Best Canadian Film at TIFF.

His other filmmaking awards include:

- Best Film, Morelia International Film Festival, Where are their Stories (2007)
- Best Documentary, Curtas Vila do Conde, Interview with the Earth (2008)
- Best Documentary, Guanajuato International Film Festival, Mexico for Interview with the Earth (2008)
- K.M. Hunter Award, Film & Video (2009)
- Best Film, Guadalajara International Film Festival, Perpetuum Mobile (2010)
- Images Prize, Images Festival, All Things Were Now Overtaken by Silence (Todo, en fin, el silencio lo ocupaba) (2010)
- Best Film, Valdivia International Film Festival, Chile for Summer of Goliath (2010)
- Critics Prize, Valdivia International Film Festival, Chile for Summer of Goliath (2010)
- Orizzonti Award for Best Film, Venice Film Festival, Summer of Goliath (2010)
- Best Film, Cinema of the Future – BAFICI, Summer of Goliath (2011)
- Grand Prix du Jury, Festival La Roche-sur-Yon, The Greatest Hits (Los mejores temas) (2012)
- FIPRESCI Award, Havana Film Festival, The Greatest Hits (Los mejores temas) (2012)
- Best Documentary, Curtas Vila Do Conde, The Palace (2013)
- Special Mention, RIDM, Tales of Two Who Dreamt (Historias de dos que soñaron) (2016)

== Filmography ==
- Where Are Their Stories? (¿Dónde están sus historias?), 2007
- Interview with the Earth (Entrevista con la tierra), 2008
- Together (Juntos), 2009
- Perpetuum Mobile, 2009
- All Things Were Now Overtaken by Silence (Todo, en fin, el silencio lo ocupaba), 2010
- Summer of Goliath (Verano de Goliat), 2010
- The Greatest Hits (Los mejores temas), 2012
- Killing Strangers (Matar extraños), 2013
- The Palace (El palacio), 2013
- The Absent (Los ausentes), 2014
- The Empty Classroom (El aula vacía), 2015
- Minotaur (Minotauro), 2015
- Tales of Two Who Dreamt (Historias de dos que soñaron), 2016
- My Skin, Luminous (Mi piel, luminosa), 2019
- Fauna, 2020
- Dear Chantal (Querida Chantal), 2021
- Lázaro at Night (Lázaro de noche), 2024
- Copper (Cobre), 2025
- Everything Else Is Noise (Lo demás es ruido), 2026
