= Andrea Bussmann =

Canadian filmmaker

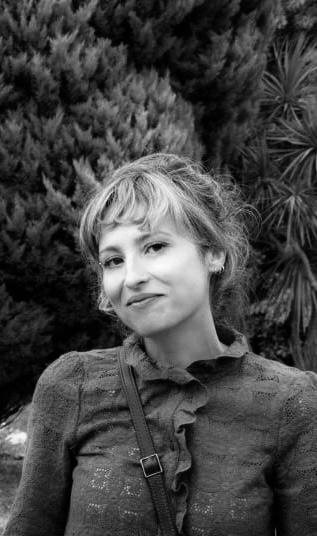
- Bussmann c. 2025
- Born: 1980 (age 45–46); Toronto, Ontario, Canada

Andrea Bussmann is a Canadian director and writer. Her work is known to combine non-fiction, fiction, and experimental forms to explore perception, alterity, nonhuman relations, and displacement.

== Early life and education ==
Bussmann was born in Toronto, Canada, in 1980. She studied anthropology and film at York University, earning an M.A. in Social Anthropology and an M.F.A. in Film Production.

In a 2018 interview, she stated that her parents are immigrants: her father is German and her mother is Maltese.

== Career ==
=== Early work and Tales of Two Who Dreamt ===
Her early work included experimental and hybrid shorts such as He Whose Face Gives No Light (2011). Bussmann came to wider attention with Tales of Two Who Dreamt (2016), co-directed with Nicolás Pereda. The film follows a Roma family living in a Toronto apartment building awaiting immigration hearings, using a hybrid form that combines fiction and non-fiction. It premiered at the 2016 Berlin International Film Festival (Forum), was selected as the Opening Film of the Images Festival in Toronto, and won the Anna Politkovskaïa Prize for Best Documentary Feature at the International Women’s Film Festival in Créteil, France.

=== Fausto (2018) ===
Her solo feature Fausto (2018) was filmed on the Oaxacan coast of Mexico. The film draws on Goethe’s Faust and the narrative structures of folklore and myth to shape its fragmented, cyclical form. Making fictions from the real, Fausto uses allegory, voiceover, and repetition to reflect on colonial legacies, migration, and perception.

The film premiered in the Filmmakers of the Present section at the 2018 Locarno International Film Festival, and also screened at the Toronto International Film Festival (Wavelengths), the Viennale, and numerous other international festivals. Beyond festivals, Fausto has also been exhibited in museums and biennials and received a limited theatrical release.

Critics have highlighted the film’s oblique narrative style and its emphasis on shadow, language, and the limits of perception. Slant Magazine described it as a meditation on "seeing as a matter of supreme knowing." Cinema Scope emphasized its "poetic destabilization of anthropocentric vision."

The film received several awards, including Best Latin American Film at the Mar del Plata International Film Festival and the Discovery Award from the Directors Guild of Canada.

=== Skin of the Sky ===
Bussmann’s upcoming project Skin of the Sky is described as a poetic essay film that drifts through the Mexican–American borderlands, tracking humans, horses, and shadows through circuits of labor, violence, and abandonment. Told in fragments and spectral images, the film lingers at the threshold where bodies vanish, stories echo, and what is visible gives way to what resists being seen.

It won the Grande Studio Award at the RIDM Rough Cut Pitch in 2024 and was selected for the Cannes Docs-in-Progress Canadian Showcase in 2025.

In 2019, Bussmann was awarded a MacDowell Fellowship (Film/Video Arts).

== Themes and style ==
Bussmann’s work merges non-fiction, fiction, and experimental forms, blurring the boundaries between ethnography and narrative invention. Her films explore perception, liminality, and alterity, while engaging with nonhuman relations, colonial histories, migration, and spectral temporality. Critics have noted her use of allegory, myth, and cyclical structures, as well as her interdisciplinary approach drawing from literature, philosophy, and anthropology in conversation with posthuman thought.
