= FIDMarseille =

Annual film festival held in Marseille

- Location: Marseille, France
- Established: 1989
- Language: International
- Website: https://fidmarseille.org/en/

FIDMarseille (Festival international de cinéma de Marseille) is an international film festival held annually in Marseille, France.

== History ==
The festival began in 1989 and was previously known as the Marseille Festival of Documentary Film.

== Program ==
In a typical year, the festival shows more than 50 narrative and documentary films and welcomes over 20,000 spectators.

The Festival has in recent years screened world premieres from notable filmmakers such as Lav Diaz, Mathieu Amalric, Angela Schanelec, Ben Rivers, and Albert Serra.

=== Sections and Awards ===
The festival sections and awards are each divided into competitive and non-competitive categories as the following

Section	Awards	Notes	Ref.
International Competition	Grand Prix, Georges De Beauregard International Award, and Special Mention	International feature-length films. Most are presented as a world or international premiere.	
French Competition	Grand Prix and Georges De Beauregard National Award	French feature-length films. Most are presented as a world premiere.	
First Film Competition	First Film Award, and Special Mention,	International feature-length debut films. Most are presented as a world or international premiere.	
Flash Competition	Flash Competition Award, and Alice Guy Award	Short films. Most are presented as a world or international premiere.	
Ciné+ Competition			

=== Special awards ===
Special Awards apply to films across sections.

- CNAP Award
- Renaud Victor Award
- École de la 2e Chance Award
- European Highschool Award / Vacances Blues Fondation
- Audience Award

== FIDLab ==
FIDLab is a co-production forum where selected films in different stages of production can find further partnerships. The program often consists of around 15 film projects from all over the world.

In 2025, in its 17th edition, they received 417 applications and selected 11 to be presented in Marseille during the festival.

== Reputation ==
FIDMarseille is known for its documentary selections and avant-garde narrative features.

== Organization ==
FIDMarseille is part of the Doc Alliance—a creative partnership between several European film festivals.
