= 2012 Halifax municipal election =

Canadian election

← 2008	October 20, 2012	2016 →
- Turnout: 37.07%
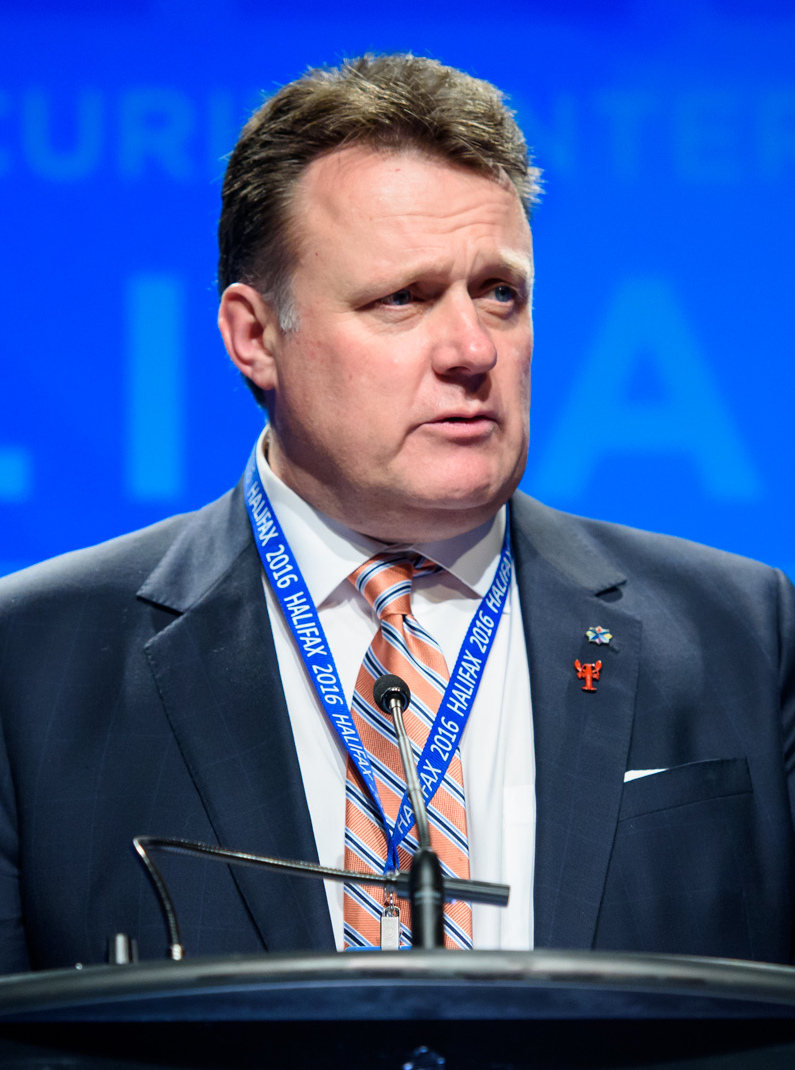
Candidate	Mike Savage	Tom Martin	Fred Connors
Popular vote	63,547	21,912	20,277
Percentage	57.75%	19.91%	18.43%
Candidate	Aaron Eisses	Steve Mackie	Wesley McCormack
Popular vote	1,628	1,458	1,218
Percentage	1.48%	1.33%	1.11%
Mayor before election
Peter J. Kelly
Elected mayor
Mike Savage

Downtown Halifax

The 2012 Halifax Regional Municipality municipal election was held on October 20, 2012 to elect councillors and a mayor to a four-year term on the Halifax Regional Council, the governing body of the Halifax Regional Municipality. This election was one of many across Nova Scotia as part of the 2012 Nova Scotia municipal elections.

In December 2011, it was decided by the Nova Scotia Utility and Review Board that the Halifax Regional Council be reduced in size from 23 districts to 16 districts, consequently forcing almost every district boundary in the HRM to be redrawn. Some incumbent councillors were forced to run against each other because of the redrawn districts.

== Candidates and results ==
Candidates were officially nominated on September 11, 2012.

=== Halifax Regional Municipality Mayor ===
On February 22, 2012 incumbent Mayor Peter J. Kelly announced that he would not be running again for mayor in 2012, opting to finish his term because being mayor had taken a negative toll on his personal life.

HRM Total Population, 2011 Census: 390,096
Candidate	Votes	%	±
Mike Savage	63,547	57.749	
Tom Martin	21,912	19.913	
Fred Connors	20,277	18.427	
Aaron Eisses	1,628	1.479	
Steve Mackie	1,458	1.325	
Robert (Wesley) McCormack	1,218	1.107	
Turnout	110,040	37.07	

=== District 1: Waverley - Fall River - Musquodoboit Valley ===
Total Population, 2011 Census:
Candidate	Votes	%	±
Barry Dalrymple (Incumbent)	3,806	57.242	
Steve Streatch (Incumbent)	2,843	42.758	
Turnout	6,649		

=== District 2: Preston - Porters Lake - Eastern Shore ===
Total Population, 2011 Census:
Candidate	Votes	%	±
David Hendsbee (Incumbent)	3,118	40.721	
Gail McQuarrie	1,175	15.345	
Laurie Cook	1,116	14.575	
Keith Leahy	1,080	14.105	
Jason Josey	798	10.422	
Will Gilligan	370	4.832	
Turnout	7,657		

=== District 3: Dartmouth South - Eastern Passage ===
Total Population, 2011 Census:
Candidate	Votes	%	±
Bill Karsten (Incumbent)	3,321	41.383	
Jackie Barkhouse (Incumbent)	3,253	40.535	
Jim MacDonald	1,451	18.08	
Turnout	8,025		

=== District 4: Cole Harbour - Westphal ===
Total Population, 2011 Census:
Candidate	Votes	%	±
Lorelei Nicoll (Incumbent)	4,626	62.086	
Angela Jones	1,905	25.567	
Barry Smith	920	12.347	
Turnout	7,451		

=== District 5: Dartmouth Centre ===
Total Population, 2011 Census:
Candidate	Votes	%	±
Gloria McCluskey (Incumbent)	4,760	52.678	
Sam Austin	1,758	19.456	
Sonya Dudka	1,195	13.225	
Kate Watson	562	6.220	
Bill Zebedee	460	5.091	
Ken Bowman	157	1.737	
Bryn Jones-Vaillancourt	144	1.594	
Turnout	9,036		

=== District 6: Harbourview - Burnside - Dartmouth East ===
Candidate	Votes	%	±
Darren Fisher (Incumbent)	4,518	69.497	
Jerry Pye	1,983	30.503	
Turnout	6,501		

By-election held January 23, 2016 to replace Fisher, who was elected to the House of Commons:

Candidate	Votes	%	±
Tony Mancini	1,475	45.1	
Matt Spurway	1,199	36.7	
Don Smeltzer	541	16.5	
P. D. F. Boyd III	56	1.7	

=== District 7: Peninsula South - Downtown ===
Candidate	Votes	%	±
Waye Mason	1,949	32.188	
Sue Uteck (Incumbent)	1,855	30.636	
Gerry Walsh	1,796	29.661	
Dawgfather PHD	357	5.896	
Mike MacDonell	98	1.618	
Turnout	6,055		

=== District 8: Peninsula North ===
Candidate	Votes	%	±
Jennifer Watts (Incumbent)	3,906	52.360	
Doug MacDonald	1,638	21.957	
Dawn Marie Sloane (Incumbent)	1,558	20.885	
Karen Dempsey	263	3.525	
James McKay	95	1.273	
Turnout	7,460		

=== District 9: Peninsula West - Armdale ===
Candidate	Votes	%	±
Linda Mosher (Incumbent)	4,900	56.693	
Richard MacLean	2,649	30.649	
John Wimberly	699	8.087	
Giovanni (John) Abati	395	4.570	
Turnout	8,643		

=== District 10: Birch Cove - Rockingham - Fairview ===
Candidate	Votes	%	±
Russell Walker (Incumbent)	3,084	54.011	
Kurt Bulger	1,961	34.343	
John Thibeau	665	11.646	
Turnout	5,710		

=== District 11: Spryfield - Sambro - Prospect Road ===
Candidate	Votes	%	±
Steve Adams (Incumbent)	3,005	48.759	
Tom Lavers	1,409	22.862	
Jim Hoskins	1,073	17.410	
Peter Grabosky	676	10.969	
Turnout	6,163		

=== District 12: Timberlea - Beechville - Clayton Park West ===
Candidate	Votes	%	±
Reg Rankin (Incumbent)	2,831	43.454	
Mary Wile (Incumbent)	1,904	29.225	
Bruce E. Smith	1,536	23.576	
P. Rano Khokhar	244	3.745	
Turnout	6,515		

=== District 13: Hammonds Plains - St. Margarets ===
Candidate	Votes	%	±
Matt Whitman	3,202	44.702	
Peter Lund (Incumbent)	2,897	40.444	
Doug Poulton	1,064	14.854	
Turnout	7,163		

=== District 14: Upper/Middle Sackville - Beaver Bank ===
Candidate	Votes	%	±
Brad Johns (Incumbent)	3,141	72.524	
Laurie Sauers	1,190	27.476	
Turnout	4,331		

=== District 15: Lower Sackville ===
Candidate	Votes	%	±
Steve Craig	2,524	41.181	
Stephen Taylor	1,852	30.217	
Curt Wentzell	755	12.318	
Janet Langille	698	11.388	
Ian Wilson	300	4.895	
Turnout	6,129		

=== District 16: Bedford - Wentworth ===
Candidate	Votes	%	±
Tim Outhit (Incumbent)	5,386	83.621	
Mark Ward	1,055	16.379	
Turnout	6,441		
