= 2024 Halifax municipal election =

- Mayoral election
- October 19, 2024
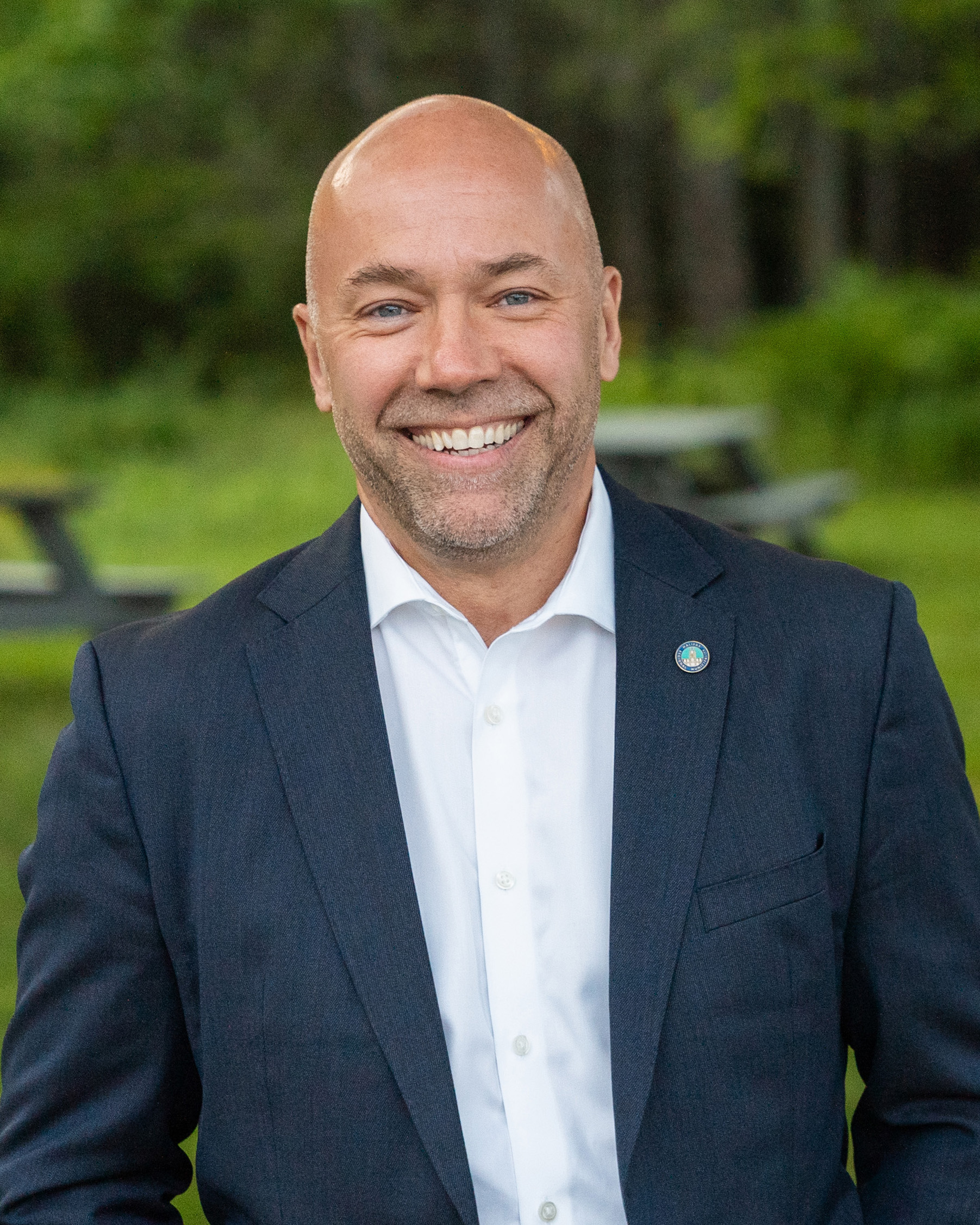

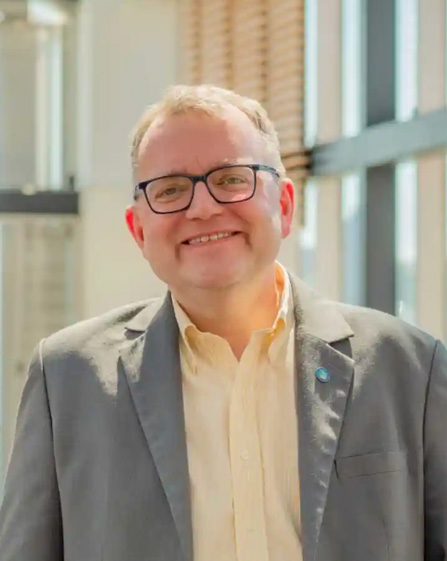
| Nominee | Andy Fillmore | Waye Mason |
| Popular vote | 52,413 | 30,906 |
| Percentage | 42.43 | 25.02 |
| Nominee | Pam Lovelace | Jim Hoskins |
| Popular vote | 19,745 | 7,220 |
| Percentage | 15.98 | 5.84 |
Mayor before election
Mike Savage
Elected mayor
Andy Fillmore

The 2024 Halifax municipal election took place on October 19, 2024 to elect councillors and a mayor to a four-year term on the Halifax Regional Council, the governing body of the Halifax Regional Municipality. Members of the Conseil scolaire acadien provincial were also elected. Elections took place as part of municipal elections held across the province.

== Electoral system ==
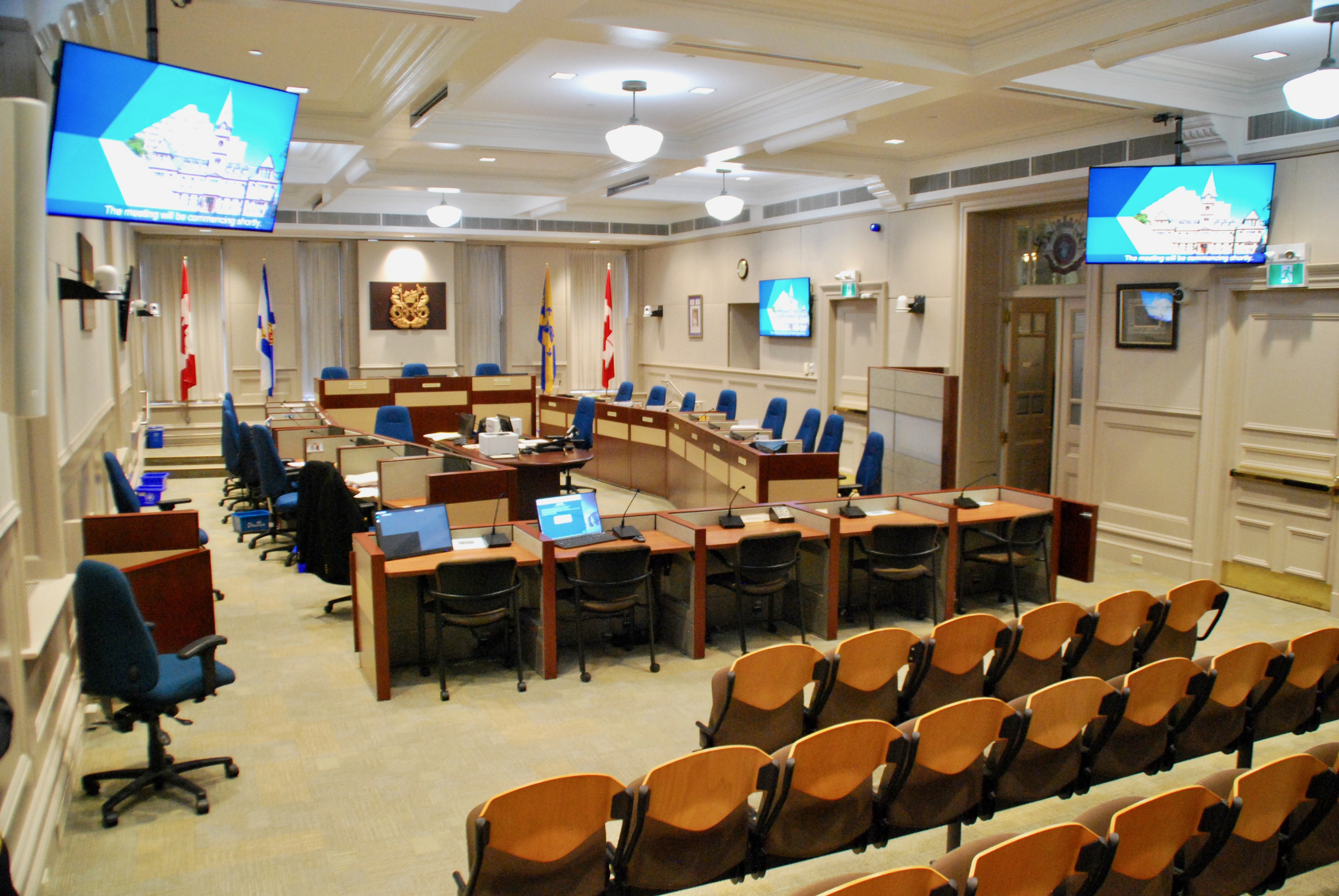
Council chamber, Halifax City Hall

Councillors (elected by residents of each of the 16 electoral districts) and the mayor (elected at-large by all voters) are chosen using the first-past-the-post voting system. Each district elects one councillor; the candidate with the most votes wins. There are no political parties at the municipal level in Nova Scotia.

New electoral district boundaries come into effect for the 2024 election, replacing the boundaries that were used for the 2016 and 2020 elections, which first came into effect on November 1, 2016.

== Synopsis ==
On October 19, 2023, Bedford incumbent Tim Outhit (District 16) announced that he would not re-offer. Outhit was first elected in 2008.

Speaking on CityNews 95.7 radio on January 15, 2024, peninsula councillors Waye Mason (District 7) and Lindell Smith (District 8) both stated that they would not re-offer. Smith said he had always intended to serve two terms, while Mason stated that he was considering a mayoral bid should Mayor Savage decide not to reoffer.

On February 13, 2024, Mike Savage announced that he would not run for a fourth term as mayor. Savage was first elected in 2012.

== Candidates ==
=== Mayor ===
Incumbent Mike Savage did not run for re-election.

The official candidates for Mayor were:

- Bob Anders
- Alex Andreas
- David Boyd
- Sean Dibbin, amateur historian
- Ryan Dodge
- Andy Fillmore, former MP
- Greg Frampton, non-profit manager
- Andrew Goodsell, homeless man
- Nolan Greenough, mechanic
- Jim Hoskins, retired police officer
- Darryl Johnson
- Zoran Jokic, business owner and activist
- Pam Lovelace, former Deputy Mayor
- Waye Mason, entrepreneur and Member of the Halifax Regional Council
- Riley Murphy
- Ross Rankin, graduate from Saint Mary's University

Results

| Mayoral candidate | Vote | % |
|---|---|---|
| Andy Fillmore | 52,413 | 42.43 |
| Waye Mason | 30,906 | 25.02 |
| Pam Lovelace | 19,745 | 15.98 |
| Jim Hoskins | 7,220 | 5.84 |
| Darryl Johnson | 4,667 | 3.78 |
| Greg Frampton | 2,644 | 2.14 |
| Riley Murphy | 1,337 | 1.08 |
| Andrew Goodsell | 855 | 0.69 |
| Ross Rankin | 854 | 0.69 |
| Nolan Greenough | 607 | 0.49 |
| Alex Andreas | 540 | 0.44 |
| David Boyd | 486 | 0.39 |
| Bob Anders | 448 | 0.36 |
| Zoran Jokic | 404 | 0.33 |
| Ryan Dodge | 229 | 0.19 |
| Sean Dibbin | 174 | 0.14 |

=== District 1: Waverley - Fall River - Musquodoboit Valley ===
The official candidates for District 1 were:

- Chris Balcom
- Cathy Deagle Gammon (Incumbent)
- Angela Dennison

Results

| Council candidate | Vote | % |
|---|---|---|
| Cathy Deagle Gammon (X) | 3,777 | 67.16 |
| Chris Balcom | 1,408 | 25.04 |
| Angela Dennison | 439 | 7.81 |

=== District 2: Lawrencetown - The Lakes - Chezzetcook - Eastern Shore ===
The official candidates for District 2 were:

- Will Gilligan
- David Hendsbee (Incumbent)

Results

| Council candidate | Vote | % |
|---|---|---|
| David Hendsbee (X) | 3,822 | 53.68 |
| Will Gilligan | 3,298 | 46.32 |

=== District 3: Dartmouth South - Woodside - Eastern Passage ===
The official candidates for District 3 were:

- Becky Kent (Incumbent)
- Keith Morrison
- John Paul

Results

| Council candidate | Vote | % |
|---|---|---|
| Becky Kent (X) | 4,575 | 61.54 |
| Keith Morrison | 2,221 | 29.88 |
| John Paul | 638 | 8.58 |

=== District 4: Cole Harbour - Preston - Westphal - Cherry Brook ===
The official candidates for District 4 were:

- James Aalders
- Joe Colley
- Nicole Johnson
- Trish Purdy (Incumbent)

Results

| Council candidate | Vote | % |
|---|---|---|
| Trish Purdy (X) | 3,892 | 47.61 |
| James Aalders | 2,316 | 28.33 |
| Nicole Johnson | 1,408 | 17.22 |
| Joe Colley | 559 | 6.84 |

=== District 5: Dartmouth Centre ===
The official candidates for District 5 were:

- Sam Austin (Incumbent)
- Michael McCluskey

Results

| Council candidate | Vote | % |
|---|---|---|
| Sam Austin (X) | 5,622 | 63.39 |
| Michael McCluskey | 3,247 | 36.61 |

=== District 6: Dartmouth East - Burnside ===
The official candidates for District 6 were:

- Tony Mancini (Incumbent)
- Lori Ogden

Results

| Council candidate | Vote | % |
|---|---|---|
| Tony Mancini (X) | 6,842 | 82.25 |
| Lori Ogden | 1,477 | 17.75 |

=== District 7: Halifax South Downtown ===
The official candidates for District 7 were:

- William Breckenridge
- Cathy Cervin
- Andrea Hilchie-Pye
- Aodhan P. Murphy
- Peter Sonnichsen
- Laura White

Incumbent Waye Mason did not seek re-election, but instead ran for Mayor.

Results

| Council candidate | Vote | % |
|---|---|---|
| Laura White | 1,612 | 25.35 |
| Cathy Cervin | 1,504 | 23.66 |
| William Breckenridge | 1,203 | 18.92 |
| Andrea Hilchie-Pye | 1,003 | 15.78 |
| Peter Sonnichsen | 786 | 12.36 |
| Aodhan P. Murphy | 250 | 3.93 |

=== District 8: Halifax Peninsula North ===
The official candidates for District 8 were:

- Trayvone Clayton
- Evyeneia Dexter
- David Fright
- Jon Frost
- Virginia Hinch
- Stephen MacKay
- Anika Riopel

Incumbent Lindell Smith did not seek re-relection.

Results

| Council candidate | Vote | % |
|---|---|---|
| Virginia Hinch | 1,962 | 27.22 |
| Anika Riopel | 1,169 | 16.22 |
| Stephen MacKay | 1,003 | 13.92 |
| Trayvone Clayton | 878 | 12.18 |
| Evyeneia Dexter | 878 | 12.18 |
| Jon Frost | 835 | 11.59 |
| David Fright | 482 | 6.69 |

=== District 9: Halifax West - Armdale ===
The official candidates for District 9 were:

- Josh Beitel
- Shawn Cleary (Incumbent)
- Lara Cusson
- Valar Kaliaperumal
- Tonya Malay
- Carlos Pessoa

Results

| Council candidate | Vote | % |
|---|---|---|
| Shawn Cleary (X) | 2,578 | 28.66 |
| Tonya Malay | 2,482 | 27.59 |
| Lara Cusson | 1,330 | 14.78 |
| Carlos Pessoa | 1,287 | 14.31 |
| Josh Beitel | 699 | 7.77 |
| Valar Kaliaperumal | 620 | 6.89 |

=== District 10: Halifax - Bedford Basin West ===
The official candidates for District 10 were:

- Debbie MacKinnon
- Kathryn Morse (Incumbent)

Results

| Council candidate | Vote | % |
|---|---|---|
| Kathryn Morse (X) | 3,553 | 57.15 |
| Debbie MacKinnon | 2,664 | 42.85 |

=== District 11: Spryfield - Sambro Loop ===
The official candidates for District 11 were:

- Patty Cuttell (Incumbent)
- Bruce Holland
- Nathan Parker

Results

| Council candidate | Vote | % |
|---|---|---|
| Patty Cuttell (X) | 4,407 | 51.78 |
| Bruce Holland | 3,785 | 44.47 |
| Nathan Parker | 319 | 3.75 |

=== District 12: Timberlea - Beechville - Clayton Park - Wedgewood ===
The official candidates for District 12 were:

- Taqiuddin (Taqi) Hashmi
- Julie Scott
- Janet Steele
- Iona Stoddard (Incumbent)
- Richard Zurawski

Results

| Council candidate | Vote | % |
|---|---|---|
| Janet Steele | 3,067 | 37.56 |
| Iona Stoddard (X) | 2,065 | 25.29 |
| Richard Zurawski | 1,806 | 22.12 |
| Julie Scott | 697 | 8.54 |
| Taqi Hashmi | 531 | 6.50 |

=== District 13: Prospect Road - St. Margarets ===
The official candidates for District 13 were:

- Markus Critchley
- Nancy Hartling
- Robert Holden
- Michael A. Marriott
- Dustin O'Leary
- Dawn Edith Penney
- John Profit

Incumbent Pam Lovelace did not seek re-relection, but instead ran for Mayor.

Results

| Council candidate | Vote | % |
|---|---|---|
| Nancy Hartling | 3,643 | 46.15 |
| Dustin O'Leary | 1,668 | 21.13 |
| Michael A. Marriott | 1,492 | 18.90 |
| Robert Holden | 380 | 4.81 |
| Markus Critchley | 333 | 4.22 |
| John Profit | 227 | 2.88 |
| Dawn Edith Penney | 151 | 1.91 |

=== District 14: Hammonds Plains - Upper Hammonds Plains - Lucasville - Middle/Upper Sackville ===
The official candidates for District 14 were:

- Edward Giles
- John Martin Walker
- John A. Young

Incumbent Lisa Blackburn did not seek re-election.

Results

| Council candidate | Vote | % |
|---|---|---|
| John A. Young | 3,870 | 61.27 |
| John Martin Walker | 1,302 | 20.61 |
| Edward Giles | 1,144 | 18.11 |

=== District 15: Lower Sackville - Beaver Bank ===
The official candidates for District 15 were:

- Billy Gillis
- Paul Russell (Incumbent)

Results

| Council candidate | Vote | % |
|---|---|---|
| Billy Gillis | 3,509 | 51.61 |
| Paul Russell (X) | 3,290 | 48.39 |

=== District 16: Bedford - Wentworth ===
The official candidates for District 16 were:

- Mohammed Issa
- Anita Kirkbride
- Scott Maskell
- Prathibha Narasimhan
- Aaron Rice
- Jean St-Amand

Incumbent Tim Outhit did not seek re-election.

Results

| Council candidate | Vote | % |
|---|---|---|
| Jean St-Amand | 4,257 | 41.67 |
| Anita Kirkbride | 2,309 | 22.60 |
| Aaron Rice | 1,559 | 15.26 |
| Mohammed Issa | 931 | 9.11 |
| Scott Maskell | 894 | 8.75 |
| Prathibha Narasimhan | 265 | 2.59 |

=== Conseil scolaire acadien provincial ===
Halifax elects two councillors to the Conseil scolaire acadien provincial. The candidates were:

- Jeff Arsenault
- Jean-Philippe Bourgeois
- Katherine Howlett
- Marc Pinet

== Polling ==
=== Mayoral race ===
| Polling firm | Source | Last date of polling | Sample Size | MoE | Andy Fillmore | Jim Hoskins | Darryl Johnson | Pam Lovelace | Waye Mason | Undecided |
|---|---|---|---|---|---|---|---|---|---|---|
| Narrative Research | PDF | Oct 3, 2024 | 472 | | 24% | 4% | 0% | 12% | 19% | 32% |
| MQO Research | PDF | Oct 2, 2024 | 383 (Online) | | 29% | 3% | 4% | 6% | 8% | 38% |
| Narrative Research | PDF | Sep 19, 2024 | 482 | | 29% | 3% | 1% | 12% | 13% | 37% |
| Narrative Research | HTML | Aug 21, 2024 | 493 (Online) | – | 23% | – | – | 4% | 9% | 52% |
