= Waye Mason =

Canadian businessman and politician

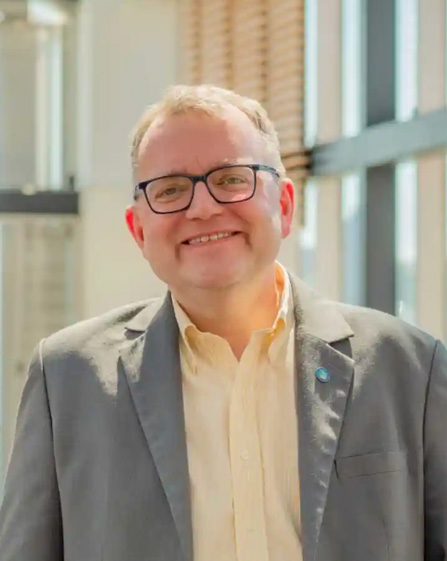
- Mason in 2024

Member of the Halifax Regional Council for Peninsula South - Downtown / Halifax South Downtown
- In office 2012–2024
- Preceded by: Sue Uteck
- Succeeded by: Laura White

Personal details
- Born: Dartmouth, Nova Scotia
- Occupation: Politician; businessman; educator
- Website: wayemason.ca

Waye Mason is a Canadian businessman, educator and former politician from Nova Scotia. He was a member of the Halifax Regional Council from 2012 to 2024, Deputy Mayor from 2018 to 2019, and a candidate for Mayor of Halifax in 2024.

== Early life and education ==
Mason was born and raised in Dartmouth, Nova Scotia. He has earned a Bachelor of Arts from Dalhousie University, a Master of Business Administration from Saint Mary's University, and a faculty diploma from the Nova Scotia Community College (NSCC).

== Career ==
=== Musical career ===
Mason began his career in the music industry as a campus community radio volunteer at CKDU, the radio station of Dalhousie University. During this time, he was also chair of the Dalhousie Student Union (DSU).

In 1993, Mason founded the record label and distributor No Records, which by 1998 was releasing music from four bands in Atlantic Canada and one from Vancouver. The label operated until 2004. In the late 1990s, he worked as a marketing director for Halifax on Music, a music festival which operated from 1996 until 1999. This festival inspired him to establish the not-for-profit Halifax Pop Explosion Association in 2001 to operate the Halifax Pop Explosion festival, serving as executive director of Halifax Pop Explosion until 2010. Mason has also worked as a business management consultant with companies such as Ticketpro Canada, DRUM!, and Gigantic Entertainment.

From 2007 to 2012, he taught music business and entrepreneurship at the Nova Scotia Community College (NSCC).

Mason has served as a president and board member of Music Nova Scotia, where he successfully lobbied for the 2002 Music Sector Strategy to drive government investment in the Nova Scotia music industry.

=== Political career ===
Mason entered politics in 2012 Halifax municipal election, when he ran for the District 7 seat on the Halifax Regional Council. He defeated incumbent councillor Sue Uteck by 96 votes, with Uteck attempting to reclaim her seat four years later in the 2016 Halifax municipal election. Mason won the 2016 election with 61% of the vote compared to Uteck's 33%. He served as deputy mayor of Halifax for one year, beginning on 14 November 2017.

Before the 2020 election, the district was renamed Halifax South Downtown to "bring greater clarity" while keeping the same boundaries, a move Mason requested with colleagues from council. In 2020, Mason was reelected for a third term in District 7, with 62% of the vote.

In 2022, Mason introduced a new bylaw forcing convenience stores in residential neighbourhoods to close by 11pm, receiving unanimous support from council. Mason said that convenience stores "can be quite disruptive to the community especially if they're serving pizza and have a lot of folks coming back from downtown, congregating outside eating said pizza". The bylaw appeared to target two specific stores, Triple A and Jubilee Junction, which made the majority of their sales after 11pm. The bylaw received significant pushback from students and residents of the area, with hundreds of people signing petitions created by the affected stores. Halifax newspaper The Coast later referred to this incident as among Mason's "quite memorable" mistakes.

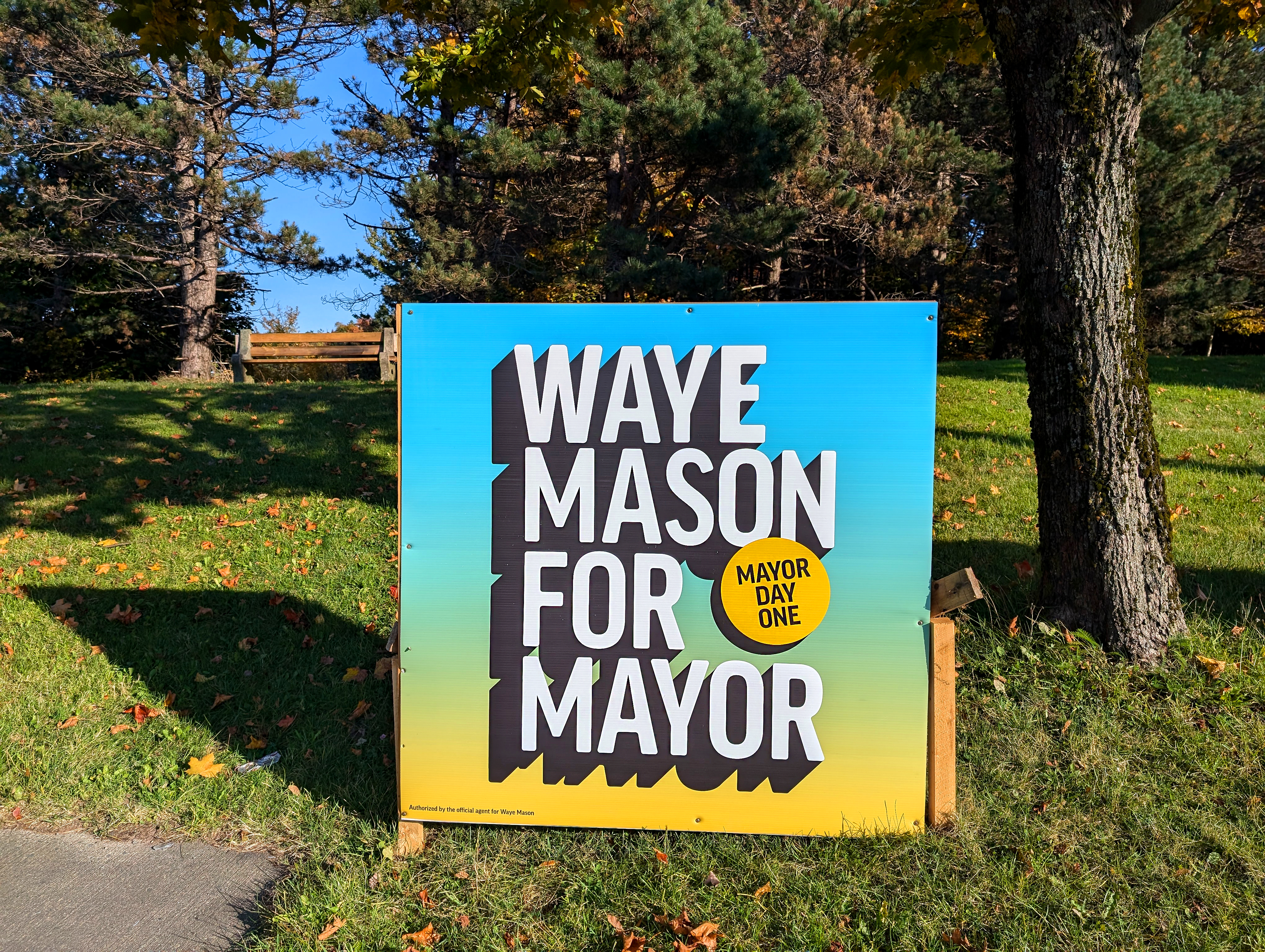
Waye Mason ran for Mayor of Halifax in 2024

Following the decision of mayor Mike Savage not to run for a fourth term, Mason entered the race for Mayor of Halifax on 10 June 2024. His mayoral campaign was endorsed by fellow councillors Lisa Blackburn, Tony Mancini, and Iona Stoddard; his campaign manager was Mat Whynott, who had helped run the previous mayoral campaign of Savage.

Mason's campaign placed an emphasis on ongoing housing instability, homelessness, and improving Halifax Transit service. Among his campaign proposals was to set up a new municipal housing authority, which would aim to provide more affordable housing in Halifax.

Mason placed second in the mayoral election to Andy Fillmore, a former Member of Parliament. Out of 16 mayoral candidates in the 2024 Halifax municipal election, Mason received 25% of the vote.

=== After politics ===
In February 2025, Mason became Executive Vice President of ATN Strategies, a Canadian strategy and research firm. He was promoted to President of the company in December of the same year.

== Family ==
Mason is the son of the Canadian Vice-Admiral Lynn Mason.

Mason's grandfather, John Burton Waye, served in the Second World War with the 3rd Canadian Infantry Division as an engineer. In 2016, Mason travelled to the Netherlands where he retrieved a helmet that belonged to his grandfather. The helmet was badly damaged from when a military vehicle his grandfather was driving in was struck by a German mortar. He survived the attack, but was left permanently deaf in one ear. Mason stated that his grandfather spoke little of his time in the war, and discovering the events he endured in the decades after his death was an emotionally impactful experience.

== Electoral record ==
2024 Halifax mayoral election
Candidate	Votes	%
Andy Fillmore	52,618	42.52
Waye Mason	30,889	24.96
Pam Lovelace	19,767	15.98
Jim Hoskins	7194	5.81
Darryl Johnson	4668	3.77
Greg Frampton	2647	2.14
Other candidates	5952	4.81
Total	123,735	100
Source: Halifax Regional Municipality

2020 Halifax municipal election
Candidate	Votes	%
Waye Mason	3728	62.11
Jen Powley	1882	31.36
Craig Roy	287	4.78
Richard Arundel-Evans	105	1.75
Total	6002	100
Registered voters/turnout	18,512	32.42
Source: Halifax Regional Municipality

2016 Halifax municipal election
Candidate	Votes	%
Waye Mason	2962	61.16
Sue Uteck	1590	32.83
Dominick Desjardins	259	5.35
Rejected ballots	32	0.66
Total	4843	100
Registered voters/turnout	15,566	31.11
Source: Halifax Regional Municipality

2012 Halifax municipal election
Candidate	Votes	%
Waye Mason	1949	32.29
Sue Uteck	1835	30.41
Gerry Walsh	1796	29.76
Dawgfather PHD	357	5.92
Mike Macdonnell	98	1.62
Rejected ballots	22	0.36
Total	6057	100
Registered voters/turnout	17,912	33.82
Source: Halifax Regional Municipality

== Publications ==
- Mason, Waye (25 August 2019). "OP-ED: Now is not the time for partisan politics". Cape Breton Post. Sydney, NS: Saltwire Network. Archived from the original on 28 August 2019.
- —; Taylor, Zach (25 October 2022). "Let Halifax Regional Municipality do its job". Saltwire Network. Halifax, NS. Archived from the original on 25 October 2022.
- — (15 November 2023). "The Nova Scotia-HRM relationship needs a reset". PNI Atlantic News. Halifax, NS: Postmedia Network. Archived from the original on 21 June 2025.
