= 2020 Halifax municipal election =

Canadian election

2020 Halifax mayoral election
- October 17, 2020
- Turnout: 39.83%
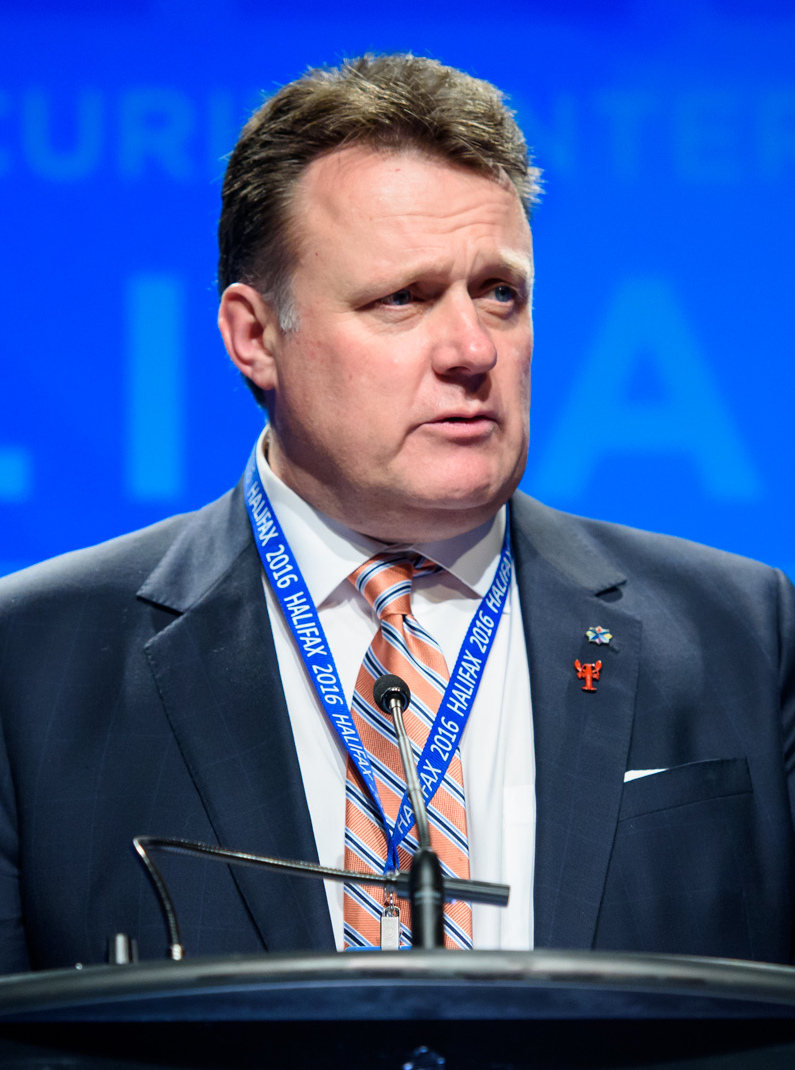
Nominee	Mike Savage	Matt Whitman	Max Taylor
Popular vote	102,735	13,497	11,928
Percentage	80.16%	10.53%	9.31%
- Results of the 2020 Halifax mayoral election by district
Mayor before election
Mike Savage
Elected mayor
Mike Savage

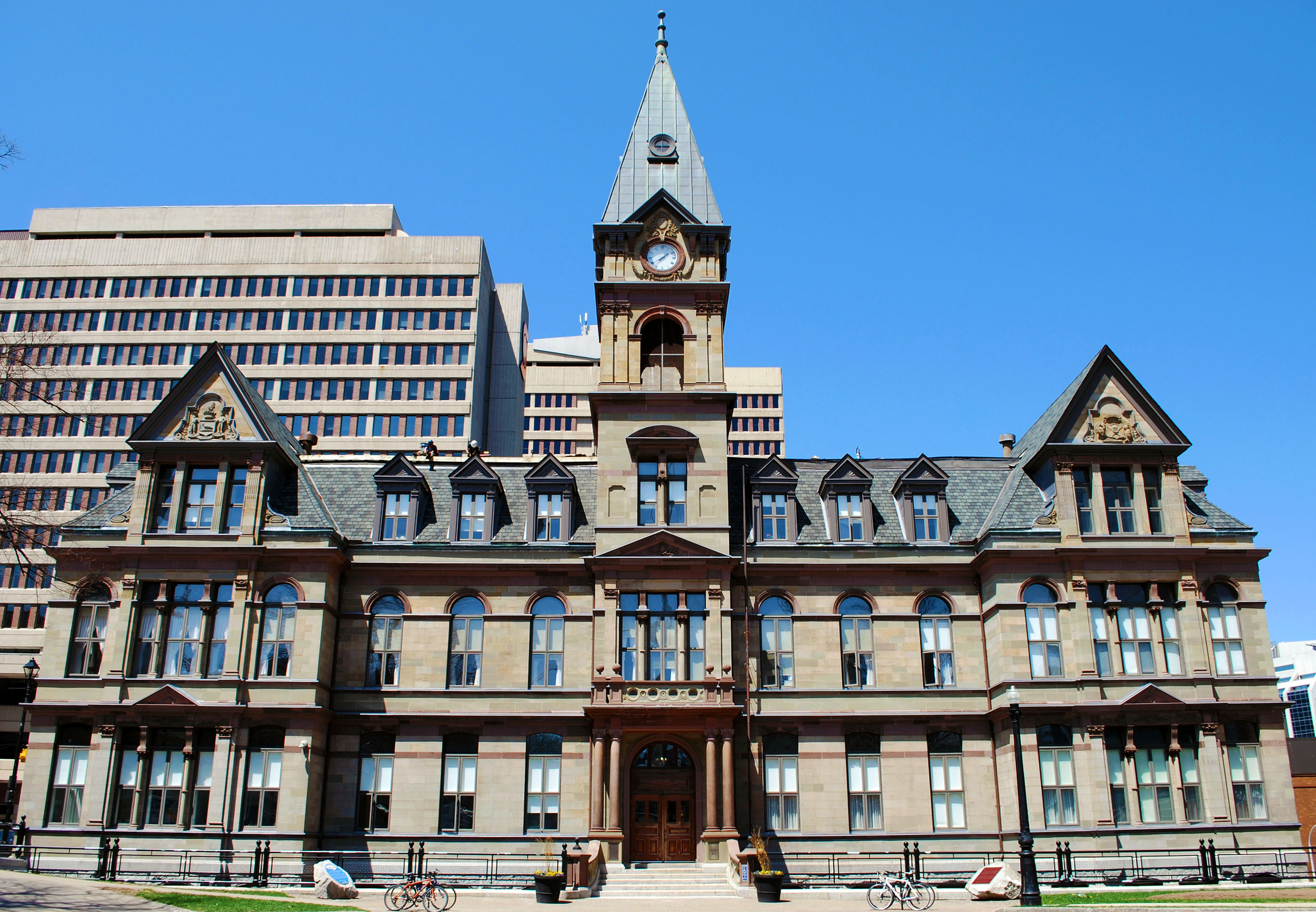
Halifax City Hall

The 2020 Halifax municipal election was held on October 17, 2020 to elect councillors and a mayor to a four-year term on the Halifax Regional Council, the governing body of the Halifax Regional Municipality. Members of the Conseil scolaire acadien provincial were also elected. The election was held in conjunction with municipal elections across the province.

Of the 16 incumbent councillors, 11 ran for re-election. Of those, nine retained their seats. Mike Savage sought another term as mayor, competing for the position against incumbent councillor Matt Whitman and social media personality and copywriter Max Taylor. Savage was handily re-elected, capturing over 80 per cent of votes cast for the position.

A record number of women were elected, achieving gender parity on Halifax council for the first time.

== Electoral system ==
Councillors (elected by residents of each of the 16 electoral districts) and the mayor (elected at-large by all voters) are chosen using the first-past-the-post voting system. Each district elects one councillor; the candidate with the most votes wins. There are no political parties at the municipal level in Nova Scotia.

The boundaries of the 16 districts, updated in 2015, were the same as those used in the 2016 election.

== Synopsis ==
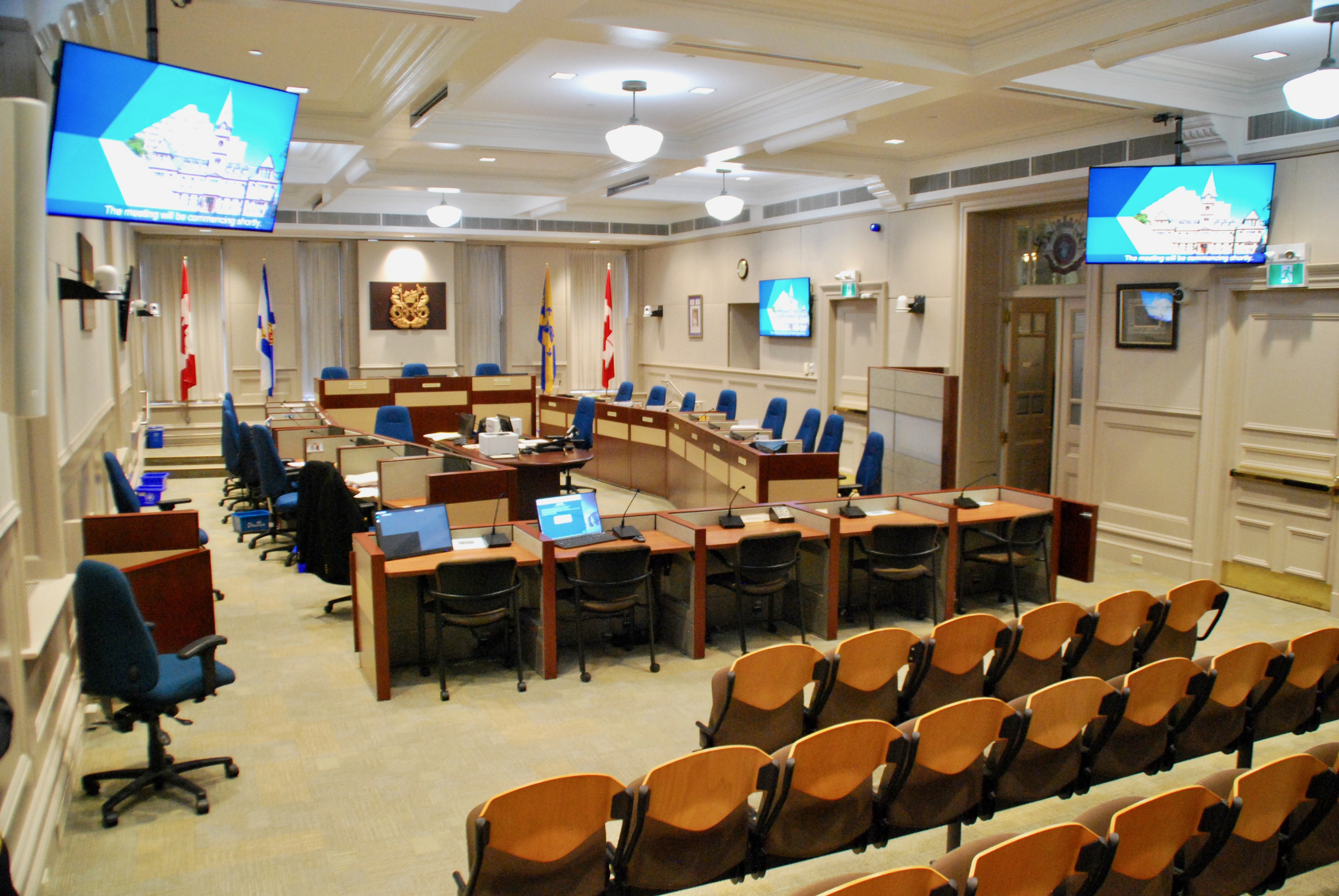
Council chambers, Halifax City Hall

In the run-up to the election, four incumbent councillors declared their intentions to retire from municipal politics. In October 2019, longtime Spryfield councillor Steve Adams (District 11) announced that he would not re-offer in the following year's election. Adams was first elected in 1991. Veteran Dartmouth councillor Bill Karsten (District 3) announced in May 2020 that he would not run again. Lorelei Nicoll (District 4) and Russell Walker (District 10) followed suit in July 2020.

The first confirmed mayoral candidate was Matt Whitman, the incumbent councillor in District 13. Whitman announced his campaign at the Grand Parade in October 2019. Incumbent mayor Mike Savage announced his candidacy for re-election in March 2020. A third candidate, Max Taylor, joined the race in September 2020. Taylor's platform centred on encouraging Halifax residents to "get out and vote".

Local market research firm Narrative Research (formerly Corporate Research Associates) polled the public in August 2020 to gauge support for Savage and Whitman (Taylor had not yet nominated). Of the decided voters polled, 89 per cent stated that they would vote for Savage for mayor.

District 12 candidate Eric Jury attracted controversy after publishing a video in which he promised, if elected, to "bring any motion you want forward" on behalf of anyone who donated over $100 to his campaign. Jury's entry on the municipality's online list of candidates included a link to the video. Richard Zurawski, the incumbent councillor for District 12, stated that he was "absolutely floored" by the video, and expressed concern that municipal staff had apparently not vetted material posted to the elections website. The legality of Jury's proclamation was questioned. A city spokesperson responded, "the returning officer for the election has reached out to this candidate, and the video has been removed. No further action will be taken at this time." Jury received only two per cent of votes cast in the district, and was not elected.

Advance telephone and Internet polls ran from October 6 to 14. Advance in-person polls ran from October 10 to 13. The election was held on October 17.

Mike Savage was re-elected as mayor by a large margin, earning a greater share of votes (80 per cent) than in 2016 (68 per cent). A record number of women (eight) were elected, achieving gender parity on council for the first time in history. In contrast, only two women were elected in the 2016 election. Of the 11 incumbent councillors that ran for re-election, nine retained their seats while two (Steve Streatch and Richard Zurawski) did not.

The results for most districts were known by the end of election day, as the unofficial results provided a clear indication of the winning candidates. However, the race in District 11 was too close to call, as Patty Cuttell led Bruce Holland by a small margin and results from two polls had not been published. The results were issued the following afternoon, with Cuttell winning the race by 28 votes. The municipal returning officer attributed the delay to confusion surrounding the tallying of two advance polls, as well as a large number of new, inexperienced election staff. Holland requested an official recount, commenting that the number of spoiled and rejected ballots was greater than the 28 votes that won the race. On 28 October 2020, the judicial recount was officially ordered. The recount confirmed Cuttell's win.

Voter turnout increased over the previous election. In 2016, only 33.62 per cent of eligible residents voted. In 2020, approximately 39.65 per cent voted. A professor of political science at Cape Breton University commented that the ongoing COVID-19 pandemic may have prompted a stronger interest in community affairs. The pandemic may also have encouraged the use of e-voting.

The new council was sworn in on October 29, 2020 at the Halifax Convention Centre with the exception of Patty Cuttell, who had to await the results of the District 11 recount. Cuttell was sworn in on 10 November.

== Candidates and results ==
Note: The figures below do not take into account spoiled or rejected ballots.

=== Mayor ===
Mike Savage was re-elected as mayor.

Candidate	Votes	%
Mike Savage (incumbent)	102,735	80.16
Matt Whitman	13,497	10.53
Max Taylor	11,928	9.31
Total	128,160	100
Registered voters/turnout	322,232	39.77
Source: Halifax Regional Municipality

=== District 1: Waverley - Fall River - Musquodoboit Valley ===
Cathy Deagle Gammon was elected, unseating incumbent Steve Streatch.

Candidate	Votes	%
Cathy Deagle Gammon	3,062	42.38
Steve Streatch (incumbent)	2,953	40.87
Stephen Kamperman	1,005	13.91
Arthur Wamback	205	2.84
Total	7,225	100
Registered voters/turnout	16,686	43.30
Source: Halifax Regional Municipality

=== District 2: Preston - Chezzetcook - Eastern Shore ===
Incumbent David Hendsbee was re-elected.

Candidate	Votes	%
David Hendsbee (incumbent)	4,379	50.90
Nicoll Johnson	2,436	28.32
Tim Milligan	1,538	17.88
David Boyd	250	2.91
Total	8,603	100
Registered voters/turnout	20,609	41.74
Source: Halifax Regional Municipality

=== District 3: Dartmouth South - Eastern Passage ===
Incumbent Bill Karsten did not re-offer. Becky Kent, who served as regional councillor for the former Woodside-Eastern Passage district from 2004 to 2007, was elected.

Candidate	Votes	%
Becky Kent	4,309	43.44
Vishal Bhardwaj	1,818	18.33
Lloyd Jackson	1,575	15.88
Clinton Desveaux	1,283	12.93
George Mbamalu	934	9.42
Total	9,919	100
Registered voters/turnout	22,851	43.41
Source: Halifax Regional Municipality

=== District 4: Cole Harbour - Westphal ===
Incumbent Lorelei Nicoll did not re-offer. Trish Purdy was elected.

Candidate	Votes	%
Trish Purdy	1,634	19.70
Darryl Johnson	1,294	15.60
Jessica Quillan	1,111	13.40
Chris Mont	1,039	12.53
Kevin Foran	858	10.35
Tania Meloni	758	9.14
John Stewart	597	7.20
Jamie MacNeil	451	5.44
Jerome Lagmay	169	2.04
Ryan Burris	144	1.74
Caroline Williston	125	1.51
Marisa DeMarco	113	1.36
Total	8,293	100
Registered voters/turnout	19,709	42.08
Source: Halifax Regional Municipality

=== District 5: Dartmouth Centre ===
Incumbent Sam Austin was re-elected.

Candidate	Votes	%
Sam Austin (incumbent)	7,769	82.07
Mitch McIntyre	1,697	17.93
Total	9,466	100
Registered voters/turnout	22,292	42.46
Source: Halifax Regional Municipality

=== District 6: Harbourview - Burnside - Dartmouth East ===
Incumbent Tony Mancini was re-elected.

Candidate	Votes	%
Tony Mancini (incumbent)	5,637	79.72
Ibrahim Manna	960	13.58
Douglas Day	474	6.70
Total	7,071	100
Registered voters/turnout	20,142	35.11
Source: Halifax Regional Municipality

=== District 7: Halifax South Downtown ===
Incumbent Waye Mason was re-elected.

Candidate	Votes	%
Waye Mason (incumbent)	3,728	62.11
Jen Powley	1,882	31.36
Craig Roy	287	4.78
Richard Arundel-Evans	105	1.75
Total	6,002	100
Registered voters/turnout	18,512	32.42
Source: Halifax Regional Municipality

=== District 8: Halifax Peninsula North ===
Incumbent Lindell Smith was re-elected.

Candidate	Votes	%
Lindell Smith (incumbent)	5,779	67.88
Virginia Hinch	2,261	26.56
Dylan Kennedy	473	5.56
Total	8,513	100
Registered voters/turnout	21,100	40.35
Source: Halifax Regional Municipality

=== District 9: Halifax West Armdale ===
Incumbent Shawn Cleary was re-elected.

Candidate	Votes	%
Shawn Cleary (incumbent)	3,880	41.72
Stephen Foster	2,913	31.32
Bill Carr	1,846	19.85
Shaun Clark	375	4.03
Gerry Lonergan	286	3.08
Total	9,300	100
Registered voters/turnout	21,511	43.23
Source: Halifax Regional Municipality

=== District 10: Halifax - Bedford Basin West ===
Incumbent Russell Walker did not re-offer. Kathryn Morse was elected.

Candidate	Votes	%
Kathryn Morse	1,924	27.48
Debbie MacKinnon	1,286	18.37
Renee Field	1,190	17.00
Andrew Curran	1,100	15.71
Mohammad Ehsan	850	12.14
Sherry Hassanali	372	5.31
Kyle Morton	165	2.36
Christopher Hurry	115	1.64
Total	7,002	100
Registered voters/turnout	19,154	36.56
Source: Halifax Regional Municipality

=== District 11: Spryfield - Sambro Loop - Prospect Road ===
Incumbent Steve Adams did not re-offer. Patty Cuttell was elected.

Candidate	Votes	%
Patty Cuttell	1,662	19.58
Bruce Holland	1,635	19.25
Matthew Conrad	1,482	17.46
Pete Rose	972	11.45
Bruce Cooke	781	9.20
Hannah Munday	465	5.48
Jim Hoskins	441	5.19
Ambroise Matwawana	309	3.65
Stephen Chafe	274	3.23
Lisa Mullin	252	2.97
Kristen Hollery	151	1.77
Dawn Edith Penney	66	0.78
Total	8,490	100
Registered voters/turnout	20,844	40.73
Source: Halifax Regional Municipality

=== District 12: Timberlea - Beechville - Clayton Park - Wedgewood ===
Iona Stoddard was elected, unseating incumbent Richard Zurawski.

Candidate	Votes	%
Iona Stoddard	3,074	37.65
Richard Zurawski (incumbent)	2,675	32.76
John Bignell	2,243	27.47
Eric Jury	173	2.12
Total	8,165	100
Registered voters/turnout	20,968	38.94
Source: Halifax Regional Municipality

=== District 13: Hammonds Plains - St. Margarets ===
Incumbent councillor Matt Whitman did not re-offer as he ran for mayor. Candidates are not allowed to run for mayor and councillor at the same time. Pam Lovelace was elected.

Candidate	Votes	%
Pam Lovelace	3,444	36.26
Nick Horne	2,164	22.78
Darrell Jessome	1,808	19.03
Tim Elms	1,053	11.09
Harry Ward	323	3.40
Tom Arnold	307	3.23
Robert Holden	178	1.87
Iain Taylor	144	1.52
Derek Bellemore	78	0.82
Total	9,499	100
Registered voters/turnout	19,845	47.87
Source: Halifax Regional Municipality

=== District 14: Middle/Upper Sackville - Beaver Bank - Lucasville ===
Incumbent Lisa Blackburn was re-elected.

Candidate	Votes	%
Lisa Blackburn (incumbent)	4,898	85.11
Greg Frampton	857	14.89
Total	5,755	100
Registered voters/turnout	18,012	31.95
Source: Halifax Regional Municipality

=== District 15: Lower Sackville ===
Incumbent Paul Russell was re-elected.

Candidate	Votes	%
Paul Russell (incumbent)	2,901	51.56
Jay Aaron Roy	916	16.46
David Schofield	648	11.68
Mary Lou LeRoy	644	11.60
Anthony Mrkonjic	480	8.71
Total	5,589	100
Registered voters/turnout	16,747	33.37
Source: Halifax Regional Municipality

=== District 16: Bedford - Wentworth ===
Incumbent Tim Outhit was re-elected by acclamation.

=== Conseil scolaire acadien provincial ===
Three candidates for the Conseil scolaire acadien provincial were elected by acclamation, namely: Jeff Arsenault, Katherine Howlett, and Marc Pinet.
