= 2016 Halifax municipal election =

Canadian election

2016 Halifax mayoral election
- October 15, 2016
- Turnout: 31.77%
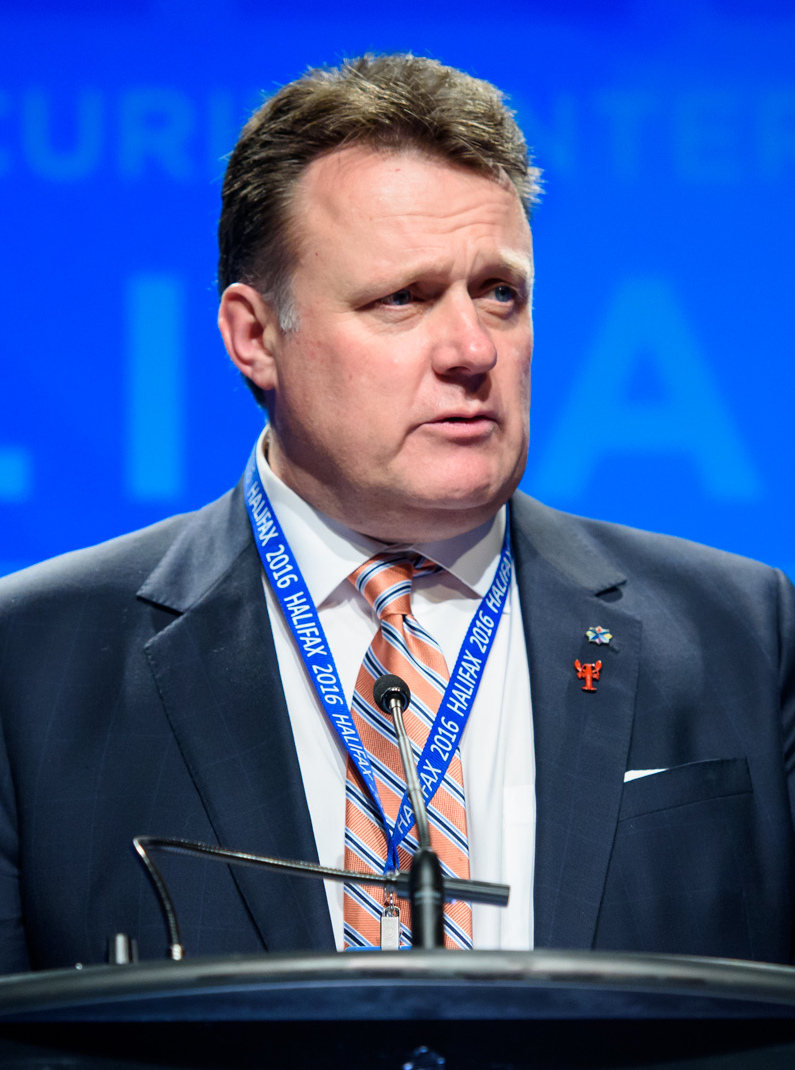
Nominee	Mike Savage	Lil MacPherson
Popular vote	61,875	28,543
Percentage	68.43%	31.57%
- Results of the 2016 Halifax mayoral election by district
Mayor before election
Mike Savage
Elected mayor
Mike Savage

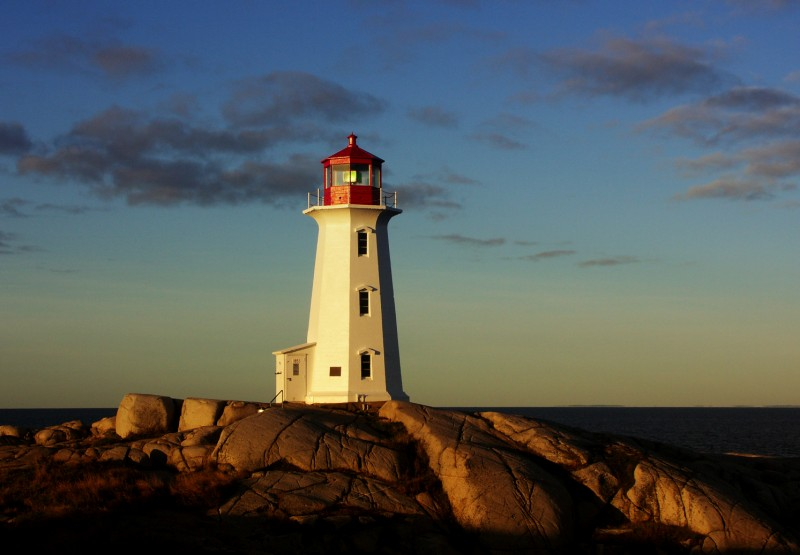
Nova Scotia's iconic Peggy's Cove is located in Halifax Regional Municipality

The 2016 Halifax Regional Municipality municipal election was held on October 15, 2016, to elect councillors and a mayor to a four-year term on the Halifax Regional Council, the governing body of the Halifax Regional Municipality. This election was one of many across Nova Scotia as part of the 2016 Nova Scotia municipal elections. School board elections were also on the ballot.

There are 16 districts in the large municipality. On June 8, 2015, the Nova Scotia Utility and Review Board approved new boundaries for four of the districts. Districts 9 and 11 swap an area of new development along Northwest Arm Drive called Long Lake Village. This neighbourhood moves from District 11 to District 9. Similarly, there is an exchange between Districts 13 and 14. A number of properties on Hammonds Plains Road in Lucasville move from District 14 to District 13.

In 2015, two councillors, Barry Dalrymple and Jennifer Watts, announced they would not be re-offering in 2016. Longtime councillor Gloria McCluskey followed suit in February 2016, and in May another long-serving councillor, Reg Rankin said his current term would be his last.

== Candidates and results ==
=== Halifax Regional Municipality Mayor ===
HRM Total Population, 2011 Census: 390,096
Candidate	Votes	%	±
Mike Savage (X)	61,875	68.43	
Lil MacPherson	28,543	31.57	
Turnout	90,418		

=== District 1: Waverley - Fall River - Musquodoboit Valley ===
The incumbent Barry Dalrymple did not re-offer.

Eligible voters:
Candidate	Votes	%	±
Steve Streatch	2,245	37.94	
Cathy Deagle-Gammon	1,790	30.25	
Trevor Lawson	1,064	17.98	
Colin Castle	395	6.68	
Steve Sinnott	263	4.44	
Alison McNair	160	2.70	
Turnout	5,917		

=== District 2: Preston - Porters Lake - Eastern Shore ===
Eligible voters:
Candidate	Votes	%	±
David Hendsbee (X)	3,262	49.62	
Gail McQuarrie	1,980	30.12	
Shelley Fashan	1,090	16.58	
Sydnee L. McKay	242	3.68	
Turnout	6,574		

=== District 3: Dartmouth South - Eastern Passage ===
Eligible voters:
Candidate	Votes	%	±
Bill Karsten (Incumbent) (Acclaimed)			
Turnout			

=== District 4: Cole Harbour - Westphal ===
Eligible voters:
Candidate	Votes	%	±
Lorelei Nicoll (Incumbent) (Acclaimed)			
Turnout			

=== District 5: Dartmouth Centre ===
The incumbent Gloria McCluskey did not reoffer.

Eligible voters:
Candidate	Votes	%	±
Sam Austin	2,371	30.59	
Tim Rissesco	1,672	21.57	
Kate Watson	1,583	20.42	
Derrek Vallis	1,068	13.78	
Ned Milburn	507	6.54	
Gabriel Enxuga	335	4.32	
Warren Wesson	173	2.23	
Adam Bowes	43	0.55	
Turnout	7,752		

=== District 6: Harbourview - Burnside - Dartmouth East ===
Eligible voters:
Candidate	Votes	%	±
Tony Mancini (X)	3,565	64.19	
Carlos Beals	1,989	35.81	
Turnout	5,554		

=== District 7: Peninsula South - Downtown ===
Eligible voters:
Candidate	Votes	%	±
Waye Mason (X)	2,962	61.57	
Sue Uteck	1,590	33.05	
Dominic Desjardins	259	5.38	
Turnout	4,811		

=== District 8: Peninsula North ===
The incumbent, Jennifer Watts did not re-offer in 2016.

Eligible voters:
Candidate	Votes	%	±
Lindell Smith	3,418	51.58	
Patrick Murphy	1,115	16.83	
Brenden Sommerhalder	761	11.48	
Chris Poole	715	10.79	
Irvine Carvery	435	6.56	
Anthony Kawalski	101	1.52	
Martin Farrell	82	1.24	
Turnout	6,627		

=== District 9: Peninsula West - Armdale ===
Eligible voters:
Candidate	Votes	%	±
Shawn Cleary	3,741	49.37	
Linda Mosher (X)	3,634	47.95	
Kyle Woodbury	203	2.68	
Turnout	7,578		

=== District 10: Birch Cove - Rockingham - Fairview ===
Eligible voters:
Candidate	Votes	%	±
Russell Walker (X)	2,007	42.56	
Andrew Curran	1,992	42.24	
Mohammad Ehsan	717	15.20	
Turnout	4,716		

=== District 11: Spryfield - Sambro - Prospect Road ===
Eligible voters:
Candidate	Votes	%	±
Steve Adams (X)	3,613	74.05	
Dawn E. Penney	1,266	25.95	
Turnout	4,879		

=== District 12: Timberlea - Beechville - Clayton Park West-Wedgewood ===
The incumbent Reg Rankin did not re-offer.

Eligible voters:
Candidate	Votes	%	±
Richard Zurawski	1,606	28.33	
Scott Guthrie	1,241	21.89	
Bruce Holland	916	16.16	
Iona Stoddard	704	12.42	
John Bignell	669	11.80	
Bruce E. Smith	533	9.40	
Turnout	5,689	31.55%	

=== District 13: Hammonds Plains - St. Margarets ===
Eligible voters:
Candidate	Votes	%	±
Matt Whitman (X)	4,088	54.94	
Pamela Lovelace	2,567	34.50	
Harry Ward	786	10.56	
Turnout	7,441		

=== District 14: Upper/Middle Sackville - Beaver Bank ===
Eligible voters:
Candidate	Votes	%	±
Lisa Blackburn	2,062	42.80	
Brad Johns (X)	2,015	41.82	
Kevin Copley	741	15.38	
Turnout	4,818		

=== District 15: Lower Sackville ===
Eligible voters:
Candidate	Votes	%	±
Steve Craig (Incumbent)(Acclaimed)			
Turnout			

=== District 16: Bedford - Wentworth ===
Eligible voters:
Candidate	Votes	%	±
Tim Outhit (Incumbent)(Acclaimed)			
Turnout			
