= Jen Powley =

Canadian writer and disability advocate (1977–2023)

- Born: Jennifer Lynn Powley; 1 November 1977; Vegreville, Alberta
- Died: 18 September 2023 (aged 45); Halifax, Nova Scotia
- Occupations: Writer; disability advocate
- Writing career
- Genres: Non-fiction; interactive fiction
- Notable awards: James McGregor Stewart Award (2019); Atlantic Book Awards (2021)

Jennifer Lynn Powley (1 November 1977 – 18 September 2023) was a Canadian writer and disability advocate from Nova Scotia. Born in Vegreville, Alberta, she was diagnosed with multiple sclerosis at the age of 15. She attended King's University College before moving to Halifax in 2001 where she earned three more degrees from Dalhousie University and the University of King's College. Powley was the President of the disability advocacy group No More Warehousing and the Rainbow Refugees Association of Nova Scotia, and was involved with a variety of other community organizations, volunteer groups, and advisory committees.

Powley was the author of three books: Just Jen in 2017, which won the Margaret and John Savage First Book Award for Non-fiction at the Atlantic Book Awards; followed by Sounds Like a Halifax Adventure, a self-published work of interactive fiction; and finally Making a Home, which chronicles her experience developing a system for shared attendant services for disabled young adults.

== Biography ==
=== Early life and education ===
Jen Powley was born on 1 November 1977 in Vegreville, Alberta, to parents Barbara Morris and William Powley. She was diagnosed with multiple sclerosis at the age of 15. She earned a Bachelor of Arts in Social Sciences from King's University College in Edmonton in 2000, and subsequently moved to Halifax, Nova Scotia, in 2001 where she earned a Bachelor of Journalism from the University of King's College the same year. She went on to earn a Master of Urban Planning from Dalhousie University in 2008, and a Master of Fine Arts in Creative Non-Fiction from the University of King's College in 2015.

=== Career ===
After moving to Halifax, Powley became employed at the Ecology Action Centre, where she worked until 2013 when she could no longer do so as a result of her condition. After she could no longer work, Powley's parents began selling their farmland in Alberta to pay for her medical bills, but with costs reaching $100,000 per year, this eventually became unaffordable. The cost of medical care put Powley in the position of being forced to choose between being institutionalized in a nursing home, or opting for the provincial self-managed attendant care program, which she said had a long waiting list and could not adequately provide for her needs.

Powley was the President of No More Warehousing, a group which advocated for community-living options for disabled people as an alternative to institutional care. In 2019, she criticized the provincial government for "saying the same thing for more than 20 years", calling on the government to adhere to a prior commitment made in 2013 to move all capable residents out of institutional care by 2023. She has also served as the provincial coordinator of the Nova Scotia League for Equal Opportunities, and as President of the Rainbow Refugees Association of Nova Scotia, a volunteer organization which sponsors refugees who identify as LGBTQ. She served on Halifax's Building Advisory Committee and Pride Accessibility Committee, and was involved with a variety of other community organizations.

Powley's first book, Just Jen: Thriving Through Multiple Sclerosis, was published in 2017 by Roseway Publishing, an imprint of Fernwood Publishing. The book was written with the help of an assistant; Powley would dictate each sentence for the assistant to type, reading it back to her as they worked to confirm the accuracy of the recording. The book won the Margaret and John Savage First Book Award for Non-fiction at the Atlantic Book Awards.

In 2019, she was awarded the James McGregor Stewart Award in recognition of her work in advocating for the rights of disabled people in Halifax. The award was presented to her by the Speaker of the Nova Scotia House of Assembly, Kevin Murphy.

Powley's second book, Sounds Like a Halifax Adventure, was a self-published work of interactive fiction. She initially began writing the book as a gift for her partner, Tom. The book was released virtually on 16 June 2020.

Powley ran for the District 7 seat on Halifax Regional Council in the 2020 municipal election. She finished second behind incumbent councillor Waye Mason. Powley described herself as "offer[ing] the public a different perspective", stating that she was "quite comfortable looking at outside-the-box answers". She expressed a need for more involvement of disabled people in politics, saying that issues concerning disability were not a talking point in the election due to lack of visibility.

Powley's third book, Making a Home: Assisted Living in the Community for Young Disabled People, was published in 2023, also by Roseway Publishing. The book chronicles her work developing a system for shared attendant services for disabled young adults. It explores the ways in which institutionalizing disabled young adults in nursing homes can adversely affect their mental health. The book was listed amongst "15 Canadian books to mark International Day of Persons with Disabilities" by CBC Books in 2023.

=== Death and legacy ===
Powley died on 18 September 2023 due to complications with multiple sclerosis. She was 45 years old. On 25 October 2023, Nova Scotia politician Trevor Boudreau described her in the Nova Scotia House of Assembly as "an indelible force who used her own voice to speak for those who couldn't and used her words to advocate for those she knew wanted more for themselves". Boudreau moved that the House join in the recognition of her impact and celebration of her life. The motion was carried without debate. A celebration of life honouring Powley was held on 29 October 2023 at Pier 21 in Halifax, where her friends and family shared speeches and music.

In 2024, Dalhousie University commemorated Powley with the Jen Powley Memorial Scholarship. The scholarship is awarded to students in two programs who are active in disability advocacy or have a disability themselves.

== Publications ==
- Powley, Jen (2017). Just Jen: Thriving Through Multiple Sclerosis. Halifax, NS: Roseway Publishing. ISBN 978-1-5526-6923-5. OCLC 968345104.
- — (2020). Sounds Like a Halifax Adventure. Halifax, NS: [Self-published].
- — (2023). Making a Home: Assisted Living in the Community for Young Disabled People. Halifax, NS: Roseway Publishing. ISBN 978-1-7736-3595-8. OCLC 1354945727.

== See also ==
- Literature of Nova Scotia
- List of writers from Nova Scotia
- Disability in Canada
