= Jo-Ann Roberts =

Canadian politician

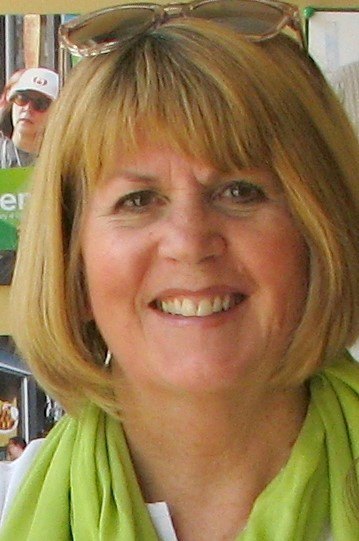
- Roberts in 2018

Deputy Leader of the Green Party of Nova Scotia
- In office October 23, 2021 – April 2024
- Leader: Anthony Edmonds
- Preceded by: Jenn Kang (interim)

Interim Leader of the Green Party of Canada
- In office November 4, 2019 – October 3, 2020
- Preceded by: Elizabeth May
- Succeeded by: Annamie Paul

Deputy Leader of the Green Party of Canada
- In office March 19, 2018 – November 4, 2019 Serving with Daniel Green
- Leader: Elizabeth May
- Preceded by: Bruce Hyer
- Succeeded by: Jonathan Pedneault (2022)

Personal details
- Born: 1956 (age 69–70) Halifax, Nova Scotia, Canada
- Party: Green
- Spouse: Ken Kelly
- Children: 4
- Education: Mount Allison University (BA); Carleton University
- Occupation: Politician; journalist

Jo-Ann Roberts (born September 8, 1956) is a Canadian politician and former journalist who served as the interim leader of the Green Party of Canada from November 4, 2019, to October 3, 2020, having been appointed upon Elizabeth May stepping down from the party's leadership role.

Roberts previously served as the party's deputy leader since March 2018 and was a broadcaster with the Canadian Broadcasting Corporation. She has been a federal Green Party candidate three times in the past, running in Victoria in 2015 and in Halifax in 2019 and 2021. She was appointed to be deputy leader of the party in 2018, serving alongside Daniel Green.

In October 2021, Roberts was elected to be the deputy leader of the Green Party of Nova Scotia, with Anthony Edmonds being elected leader of the party. Together they implemented a shadow cabinet for the party and hope to elect the first Green MLA to the Nova Scotia House of Assembly in the next election. She stepped down as Deputy Leader of GPNS in April 2024.

== Personal life ==
Roberts received a Bachelor of Arts degree from Mount Allison University and a journalism degree from Carleton University. She received a Master of Fine Arts in Creative Non-Fiction from University of Kings College. https://ukings.ca/area-of-study/master-of-fine-arts-in-creative-nonfiction/ She has written a book, Storm the Ballot Box; How to Start a Voting Revolution Before It's Too Late, which was published by Nimbus Publishing in May 2025.

She is married to Ken Kelly, with whom she has four adult children. She also has four grandchildren and cites the birth of her first grandchild as one of the forces which compelled her to move into politics in 2014. Roberts has claimed that she wanted to have an adequate answer if her granddaughter asked her what she had done to fight climate change.

== Political career ==
Roberts left her job at the CBC in 2014 to pursue a career in advocacy for public communication and the environment. She decided to run as a Green Party candidate in Victoria for the 2015 federal election campaign. While she had been approached by other parties, she claimed that the Green Party platform was the one which most aligned with her beliefs. She came second in 2015 with almost 24,000 votes, which is more votes than was received by 131 MPs who were elected.

After the election, Roberts and her family moved back to her childhood hometown of Halifax. In 2018, she was appointed by Elizabeth May to serve as the deputy leader of the party, alongside Daniel Green. She ran as the Green Party candidate in Halifax in the 2019 federal election, finishing in third with 14% of the vote.

On November 4, 2019, Elizabeth May announced that she would be stepping down as leader of the Green Party, effective immediately. She then named Roberts as the new interim leader. Roberts served until the election of Annamie Paul in October 2020.

Roberts ran in Halifax in the 2021 federal election, placing fourth.

Roberts serves as host and producer for the Green Party podcast, People, Politics, and Planet.

== Electoral record ==
2021 Canadian federal election: Halifax
| Party | Candidate | Votes | % | ±% | Expenditures |
|---|---|---|---|---|---|
| Liberal | Andy Fillmore | 21,905 | 42.74 | +0.27 | $103,501.55 |
| New Democratic | Lisa Roberts | 20,347 | 39.70 | +9.66 | $90,503.01 |
| Conservative | Cameron Ells | 6,601 | 12.88 | +1.30 | $2,924.56 |
| Green | Jo-Ann Roberts | 1,128 | 2.20 | –12.17 | $12,448.57 |
| People's | B. Alexander Hébert | 1,069 | 2.09 | +0.95 | $3,500.64 |
| Communist | Katie Campbell | 198 | 0.39 | – | $0.00 |
| Total valid votes/expense limit | | 51,248 | 99.38 | | $108,761.04 |
| Total rejected ballots | | 322 | 0.62 | –0.02 | |
| Turnout | | 51,570 | 66.06 | –6.96 | |
| Registered voters | | 78,065 | | | |
| Liberal hold | | Swing | | –4.70 | |
Source: Elections Canada

2019 Canadian federal election: Halifax
| Party | Candidate | Votes | % | ±% | Expenditures |
|---|---|---|---|---|---|
| Liberal | Andy Fillmore | 23,681 | 42.48 | −9.25 | $77,935.01 |
| New Democratic | Christine Saulnier | 16,747 | 30.04 | −6.09 | $92,096.82 |
| Green | Jo-Ann Roberts | 8,013 | 14.37 | +11.08 | $46,730.72 |
| Conservative | Bruce Holland | 6,456 | 11.58 | +2.97 | none listed |
| People's | Duncan McGenn | 633 | 1.14 | – | none listed |
| Animal Protection | Bill Wilson | 222 | 0.40 | – | $2,719.51 |
| Total valid votes/expense limit | | 55,752 | 99.36 | | $102,876.75 |
| Total rejected ballots | | 361 | 0.64 | +0.16 | |
| Turnout | | 56,113 | 73.02 | +0.40 | |
| Eligible voters | | 76,843 | | | |
| Liberal hold | | Swing | | -1.58 | |
Source: Elections Canada

2015 Canadian federal election: Victoria
| Party | Candidate | Votes | % | ±% | Expenditures |
|---|---|---|---|---|---|
| New Democratic | Murray Rankin | 30,397 | 42.28 | +5.11 | $222,151.95 |
| Green | Jo-Ann Roberts | 23,666 | 32.92 | –1.39 | $147,733.88 |
| Liberal | Cheryl Thomas | 8,489 | 11.81 | –1.25 | $36,120.06 |
| Conservative | John Rizzuti | 8,480 | 11.79 | –2.69 | $72,891.79 |
| Libertarian | Art Lowe | 539 | 0.75 | +0.26 | $900.00 |
| Animal Alliance | Jordan Reichert | 200 | 0.28 | – | $10,110.17 |
| Independent | Saul Andersen | 124 | 0.17 | – | none listed |
| Total valid votes/expense limit | | 71,895 | 99.67 | – | $234,268.29 |
| Total rejected ballots | | 241 | 0.33 | +0.08 | |
| Turnout | | 72,136 | 76.23 | +33.20 | |
| Eligible voters | | 94,627 | | | |
| New Democratic hold | | Swing | | +3.25 | |
Cheryl Thomas resigned prior to the election.
Source: Elections Canada
