= Bruce Holland =

Canadian politician

The Honourable Bruce Holland ECNS

MLA for Timberlea-Prospect
- In office May 25, 1993 – March 24, 1998
- Preceded by: riding established
- Succeeded by: Bill Estabrooks

Personal details
- Born: 1959 (age 66–67)
- Party: Conservative
- Other political affiliations: Nova Scotia Liberal Party (1990s)

Bruce Holland (born 1959) is a Canadian politician. He represented the electoral district of Timberlea-Prospect in the Nova Scotia House of Assembly from 1993 to 1998. He was a member of the Nova Scotia Liberal Party. In 2017, Holland ran as a candidate for the PC Party of Nova Scotia in Halifax Atlantic. Holland is currently the executive director of the Spryfield Business Commission and the publisher and founder of the Parkview News, a locally distributed paper.

== Early life ==
Holland graduated from Sir John A. Macdonald High School.

== Political career ==
Holland was a county councilor for Halifax County, Nova Scotia from 1991 to 1993. He entered provincial politics in the 1993 election, winning a seat in the provincial legislature. In 1997, he entered the race for the leadership of the Nova Scotia Liberal Party, but finished last on the first ballot. At the convention, after receiving 264 votes on the first ballot, Holland played a king-maker role by throwing his support to Russell MacLellan who was 121 votes short of winning. On July 18, 1997, MacLellan appointed Holland to the Executive Council of Nova Scotia as Minister responsible for the Science and Technology Secretariat. Holland was defeated by New Democrat Bill Estabrooks when he ran for re-election in the 1998 election. Holland attempted to regain the seat in the 2003 election, but finished second, losing to Estabrooks by over 3200 votes.

In June 2016, Holland announced he was running for a seat on Halifax Regional Council in the 2016 municipal election. On October 15, 2016, he placed third out of six candidates in his district.

In April 2017, Holland was nominated as the Progressive Conservative candidate in Halifax Atlantic for the 2017 Nova Scotia general election.

In March 2019, Holland was nominated as the Conservative candidate in Halifax for the 2019 federal election. He finished a distant fourth.

== Electoral record ==
=== 2019 general election ===
2019 Canadian federal election: Halifax
Party	Candidate	Votes	%	±%	Expenditures
Liberal	Andy Fillmore	23,681	42.48	−9.25	$77,935.01
New Democratic	Christine Saulnier	16,747	30.04	−6.09	$92,096.82
Green	Jo-Ann Roberts	8,013	14.37	+11.08	$46,730.72
Conservative	Bruce Holland	6,456	11.58	+2.97	none listed
People's	Duncan McGenn	633	1.14	–	none listed
Animal Protection	Bill Wilson	222	0.40	–	$2,719.51
Total valid votes/expense limit		55,752	99.36		$102,876.75
Total rejected ballots		361	0.64	+0.16	
Turnout		56,113	73.02	+0.40	
Eligible voters		76,843			
Liberal hold		Swing		-1.58	
Source: Elections Canada

=== District 12 - Halifax Municipal Election 2016: Timberlea - Beechville - Clayton Park West-Wedgewood ===
Eligible voters:
Candidate	Votes	%	±
Richard Zurawski	1,606	28.33	
Scott Guthrie	1,241	21.89	
Bruce Holland	916	16.16	
Iona Stoddard	704	12.42	
John Bignell	669	11.80	
Bruce E. Smith	533	9.40	
Turnout	5,669		

=== 2017 general election ===
2017 Nova Scotia general election
Party	Candidate	Votes	%	±%
Liberal	Brendan Maguire	4,219	55.48	+12.94%
New Democratic	Trish Keeping	1,728	22.72	-10.91%
Progressive Conservative	Bruce Holland	1,300	17.10	-6.73%
Green	Chelsey Carter	357	4.69	
Total valid votes		7,604	100.0	

=== 1993 general election ===
1993 Nova Scotia general election
Party	Candidate	Votes	%	±%
Liberal	Bruce Holland	3,470	38.62	
New Democratic Party	Bill Estabrooks	2,772	30.85	
Progressive Conservative	Debi Forsyth-Smith	2,744	30.54	
