= Gloria McCluskey =

Canadian politician

34th Mayor of Dartmouth
- In office 1992–1996
- Preceded by: John Savage
- Succeeded by: Amalgamated
- Succeeded by: Sam Austin

Personal details
- Born: Gloria McCluskey; June 3, 1931 (age 94) Nova Scotia, Canada
- Party: Liberal
- Profession: Politician

Gloria McCluskey (born June 3, 1931 in Nova Scotia) is a former Canadian municipal politician and a longtime Nova Scotia Liberal Party member.

== Career ==
Gloria McCluskey became the first female property assessor for the city of Dartmouth, Nova Scotia in June 1972.

=== Political career ===
McCluskey began her career in municipal politics in the mid-to-late 1980s. She was first elected alderman for the city of Dartmouth in 1985 and held the position until 1992. She served as Deputy mayor on the council from 1991 to 1992.

In 1989, she was on the board of directors of VON Canada, a Canadian non-profit.

Elected on September 12, 1992, McCluskey became Dartmouth's 34th and final mayor with almost 10,000 votes. She served from 1992 until April 1, 1996, when the Nova Scotia Government finalized the amalgamation of Dartmouth, Halifax, Bedford, and Halifax County.

Returning to politics in December 1997, the former Dartmouth mayor sought the Liberal nomination in Dartmouth North at the invitation of Premier Russell MacLellan. She ran unsuccessfully as the Liberal candidate in the 1998 Nova Scotia general election, losing by 449 votes to Jerry Pye.

In 2004, she rejoined municipal politics when she was elected to represent Dartmouth Centre at Halifax Regional Council. McCluskey didn't seek re-election and retired following the 2016 Halifax municipal election.

== Personal life ==
In 1952, she married Tom McCluskey.

== Honours ==
- Queen Elizabeth II Golden Jubilee Medal (2002)
- Street in Dartmouth renamed Gloria McCluskey Avenue in honor of the former Mayor.
