= David Hendsbee =

Canadian politician

MLA for Preston
- In office 1999–2003
- Preceded by: Yvonne Atwell
- Succeeded by: Keith Colwell

Personal details
- Born: April 9, 1960 (age 66) Oshawa, Ontario
- Party: Progressive Conservative

David Hendsbee (born April 9, 1960) is a Canadian politician. He represented the electoral district of Preston in the Nova Scotia House of Assembly from 1999 to 2003. He was a member of the Progressive Conservative Party of Nova Scotia. Today, he sits on the Halifax Regional Council.

== Early life and education ==
Born in April 1960 at Oshawa, Ontario, Hendsbee graduated from Saint Mary's University with a Bachelor of Commerce degree.

== Political career ==
From 1989 to 1991, Hendsbee was the executive assistant to provincial cabinet minister Tom McInnis.

Prior to the 1993 election, Hendsbee wanted to seek the Progressive Conservative nomination in the new Preston riding, but premier Donald Cameron refused to sign his nomination papers, prompting him to run as an independent candidate. On election night, Hendsbee finished second, losing to Liberal Wayne Adams by 491 votes. Hendsbee turned to municipal politics and was elected a councillor in Halifax County, Nova Scotia. In December 1995, Hendsbee was elected a councillor for the newly established Halifax Regional Municipality.

Hendsbee ran for the Progressive Conservatives in the 1999 election, and defeated New Democrat incumbent Yvonne Atwell by 304 votes in the Preston riding. He served as a backbench member of John Hamm's government, and was defeated by Liberal Keith Colwell when he ran for re-election in 2003. Following his defeat, Hendsbee announced he would run in a municipal byelection for his old Halifax Regional Council seat. In November 2003, he won the byelection, and was re-elected in the 2004, 2008, 2012, 2016, and 2020 municipal elections.

== Personal life ==
Hendsbee resides in Seaforth, Nova Scotia with his wife, Susan Goodyer.
