= Andy Fillmore =

Canadian politician (born 1966)

His Worship Andy Fillmore
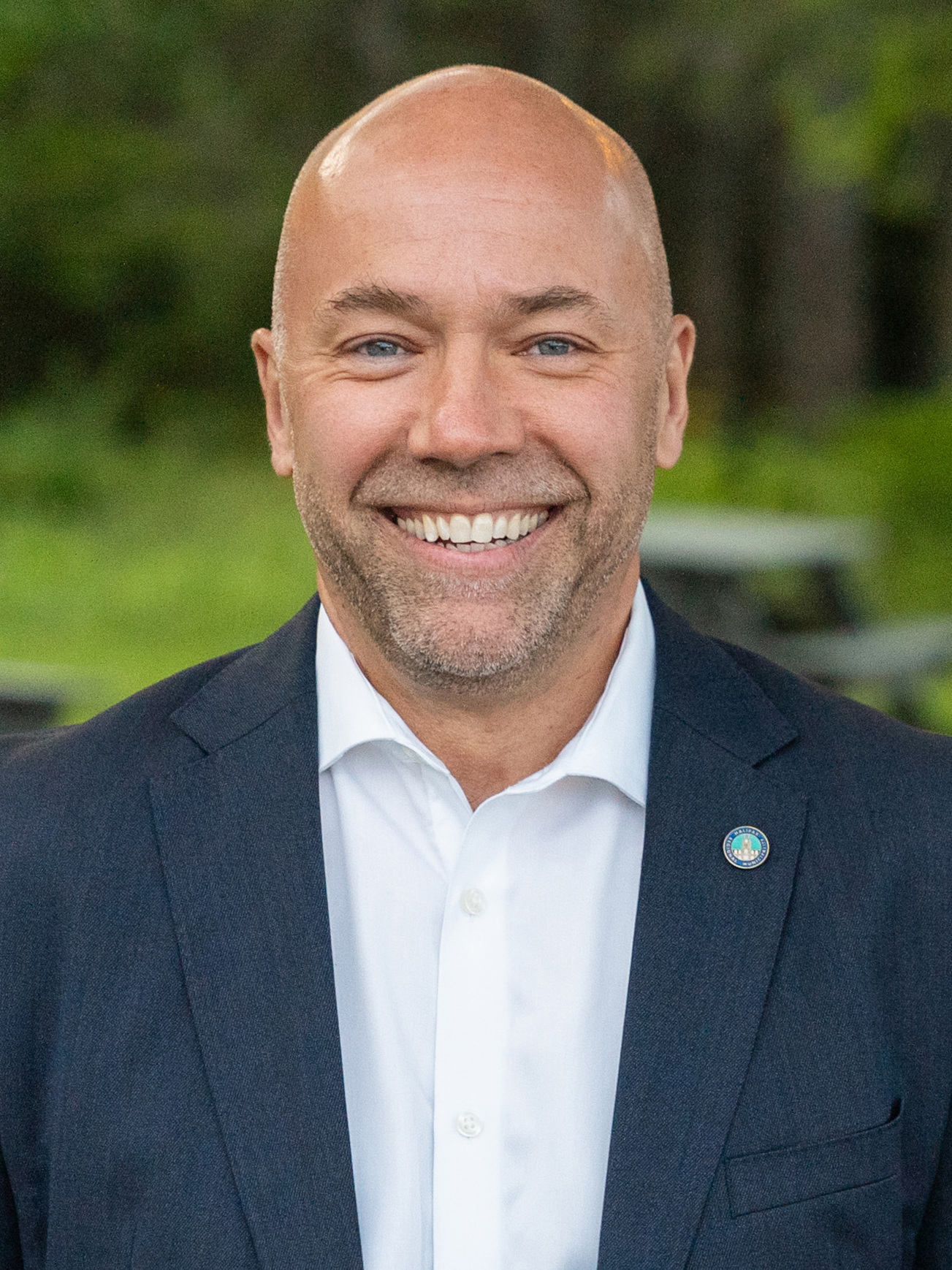
- Fillmore in 2024

4th Mayor of the Halifax Regional Municipality
- Incumbent
- Assumed office November 5, 2024
- Preceded by: Mike Savage

Parliamentary Secretary to the Minister of Democratic Institutions
- In office January 30, 2017 – November 20, 2019
- Minister: Karina Gould
- Preceded by: Mark Holland
- Succeeded by: Position abolished

Chairman of the Standing Committee on Indigenous and Northern Affairs
- In office February 4, 2016 – January 27, 2017
- Preceded by: Blake Richards
- Succeeded by: MaryAnn Mihychuk

Member of Parliament for Halifax
- In office October 19, 2015 – August 31, 2024
- Preceded by: Megan Leslie
- Succeeded by: Shannon Miedema

Personal details
- Born: April 25, 1966 (age 60) Bloomington, Indiana, U.S.
- Party: Liberal
- Education: Technical University of Nova Scotia; Harvard Graduate School of Design
- Profession: City planner, urban designer

Andy Fillmore (born April 25, 1966) is a Canadian politician who has been the mayor of the Halifax Regional Municipality since November 5, 2024. He previously served as a Liberal Party of Canada Member of Parliament for the riding of Halifax from 2015 until 2024.

== Early life and education ==
Born in Bloomington, Indiana to Atlantic Canadian parents studying abroad in the United States, Fillmore returned to the family's native Nova Scotia at the age of four. In Halifax he attended Tower Road School, Halifax Grammar School, Gorsebrook Junior High, and Queen Elizabeth High School. He began his post-secondary studies in engineering at Acadia University but transferred to the Technical University of Nova Scotia (since merged into Dalhousie University) where he completed an undergraduate architecture degree in 1990, followed by a graduate degree in urban and rural planning in 1992. He was awarded a graduate degree in Design Studies (specialty in Urban Design) from the Harvard Graduate School of Design in 1995.

== Planning career ==
An urban planner and urban designer by profession, Fillmore began his career in Boston, Massachusetts working on the Big Dig project as an intern urban designer from 1992 to 1994. He then joined the architecture and planning firm Arrowstreet Inc. In 2001, he moved to Maine where he was the Town Planner in Cumberland, Maine, and then in 2003 founded the architectural design and town planning firm Interurban Planning & Design. In 2005, he returned home to Halifax, Nova Scotia to serve as the first-ever Manager of Urban Design for the City of Halifax, leading the implementation of the "HRM by Design" Downtown Halifax Plan. He then briefly served as director of the Dalhousie University School of Planning from July 2012 to February 2013, when he left to become vice president of planning and development at the Waterfront Development Corporation Limited, a Crown corporation charged with revitalizing prominent post-industrial waterfronts in Nova Scotia, until his election in October 2015.

== Member of Parliament ==
In November 2014 Fillmore won the Liberal party's nomination for Halifax. On October 19, 2015, after the longest official campaign in over a century, Justin Trudeau led the Liberals to a decisive victory in the federal election, during which Fillmore defeated Megan Leslie, an NDP MP who had represented Halifax for two terms.

As Member of Parliament for Halifax, Fillmore held a number of additional responsibilities in the House of Commons and in the Government of Canada. Beginning in January 2017, Fillmore was appointed Parliamentary Secretary to the Minister of Democratic Institutions, Karina Gould. Beginning September 2018, Fillmore was appointed Parliamentary Secretary to the Minister of Canadian Heritage and Multiculturalism, Pablo Rodriguez. Following his reelection to the House of Commons for the 43rd Canadian Parliament in the October 2019 federal election, Fillmore was appointed Parliamentary Secretary to Canada's Minister of Infrastructure and Communities, Catherine McKenna. Following his reelection to the House of Commons for the 44th Canadian Parliament in October 2021, Fillmore was appointed Parliamentary Secretary to Canada's Minister of Innovation, Science and Economic Development, Francois-Philippe Champagne. During his nine years as a Parliamentarian Fillmore also sat on a number of House of Commons standing committees. These included chairing the Standing Committee on Indigenous and Northern Affairs, and membership on the Procedures and House Affairs Committee (PROC); membership on the Canadian Heritage Committee (CHPC), Membership on the Veterans Affairs Committee (ACVA), membership on the Transport, Infrastructure and Communities Committee (TRAN); membership on the Industry and Technology Committee (INDU), and; membership on the National Defence Committee (NDDN).

== Mayor of Halifax Regional Municipality ==
On July 3, 2024, he announced his candidacy for mayor of Halifax in the 2024 municipal election, and resigned his position as the Member of Parliament for Halifax on August 31, 2024. He was elected mayor on October 19 with 42.4 per cent of the vote, defeating three-term councillor Waye Mason.

Fillmore was sworn in as mayor along with the rest of regional council on November 5, 2024.

=== Housing ===
During his election campaign, in the context of an ongoing housing shortage affecting Halifax and Nova Scotia, Fillmore suggested that the Canada Post sorting and distribution plant on Almon Street in Halifax be redeveloped as housing. In response, a spokesperson for Canada Post stated that the facility was "central to mail service in Atlantic Canada" and that the Crown corporation had no plans to relocate it.

Fillmore also pledged, if elected, to remove tents erected by homeless people outside designated encampment sites within 24 hours. He claimed that Halifax's designated outdoor encampment sites, sanctioned by the municipality in an attempt to manage homelessness, were attracting unhoused people to Halifax from across Canada. Homelessness workers responded that Fillmore's comments were inaccurate. Waye Mason, an incumbent councillor also running for mayor, commented that municipal data indicated that 61 per cent of homeless people had resided in Halifax for more than a decade, while another 39 per cent had been in Halifax for over five years, making Fillmore's claims "provably untrue". Federal housing advocate Marie-Josée Houle stated that Fillmore's promise to forcibly remove tents would violate the human rights of unhoused people.

Fillmore also argued against expanding the number of approved encampment locations. During his first in-chamber council meeting on November 12, 2024, Fillmore put forward a motion to remove nine locations from the municipality's list of potential future encampment sites, arguing that there existed sufficient indoor shelter capacity. The motion was debated at council on December 3, 2024, and defeated. Fillmore commented that he believed the "worst of the housing crisis" had passed, contradicting the municipality's own director of housing and provoking critical responses from housing organizations.

=== Transportation ===
While campaigning for mayor, Fillmore highlighted worsening traffic in Halifax and pledged to fix potholes, reduce congestion, and make transit reliable. He also campaigned against a section of multi-use pathway to be constructed on Coburg Road as part of the Halifax Urban Greenway project.

On June 10, 2025, Fillmore put forward a motion to pause the awarding of bike lane design and construction contracts, citing worsening traffic congestion, "a lack of system-wide planning", and escalating costs. Sustainable transportation advocates organized a rally in opposition that morning at the Grand Parade, commenting that cycling infrastructure constituted only a small proportion of the overall roads budget. Fillmore's motion was defeated with 12 voting against and 5 in support. Councillors who voted against the motion stated that bike lanes were not the cause of congestion and that the motion was not aligned with the municipality's strategic plans, while those in support commented that bikeway plans warranted a "sober second look". Multiple councillors stated that Fillmore's claims about bike lanes worsening congestion lacked substantiating evidence.

Fillmore put forward a follow-up motion that passed, 11 to 6, requesting a staff report about the design of the planned Morris Street bike lane. He stated that the bike lane would come at the expense of other road users, since the plan called for making Morris Street one-way for motor vehicles. On July 8, 2025, council voted to continue with the bike lane plan, but in the form of a two-year pilot using lightweight, low-cost materials, while also instructing the chief administrative officer (CAO) to investigate converting a portion of Lower Water Street to two-way traffic in response to local traffic concerns. Nova Scotia premier Tim Houston criticized Halifax council for defeating Fillmore's motion, claiming that there existed a "serious disconnect" between Halifax council's decisions and the wishes of residents, although a large majority of letters received from the public were in support of the bike lane plan. Council subsequently voted to rescind their earlier decision in response to a letter from Tim Houston in which he stated that his government would halt the bike lane project if council did not.

=== Mayoral powers ===
The legislation that gives Halifax council its authority, the Halifax Regional Municipality Charter, defines the mayor as a council member elected at large to serve as chair of the council. As mayor, Fillmore has lobbied for expanded mayoral powers.

In July 2025, Fillmore stated that he did not "fully understand the barriers to fulfilling the mandate that [he] was elected to deliver", and said that he believed most Haligonians would be surprised to learn that the mayor has only one vote. He began to publicly advocate that the province bestow the mayor extra powers, alleging that power is concentrated with "an unelected CAO" and that "nobody [is] directly accountable". A day after Fillmore made these remarks, CAO Cathie O'Toole announced her resignation partway through her contract, citing the mayor's campaign for "direct authority over senior staff" as one factor in her decision.

Multiple councillors stated that Fillmore was "spreading misinformation" about the mayor's role, thereby causing "public confusion". In particular, they cited a July 22, 2025 appearance that Fillmore made on CBC's Maritime Noon radio program in which he stated that, according to the Halifax Regional Municipality's organizational chart, he reports to the CAO. In response, CAO O'Toole sent an email to council offering "factually correct information" about the matter, clarifying that the CAO reports to the mayor and council. Some councillors urged the mayor to issue a public retraction of his comments. In response to complaints submitted by members of the public, formal investigations were launched to determine whether the mayor had broken the code of conduct for elected officials. Investigators ruled that Fillmore's comments about the CAO had not violated the code of conduct.

In late July 2025, Fillmore wrote directly to Nova Scotia municipal affairs minister John Lohr to appeal for extra powers. On 16 September 2025, Premier Houston stated that the provincial government would not bring forward "strong mayor" powers during the upcoming legislative session.

== Electoral record ==
2024 Halifax municipal election
Mayoral candidate	Vote	%
Andy Fillmore	52,413	42.43
Waye Mason	30,906	25.02
Pam Lovelace	19,745	15.98
Jim Hoskins	7,220	5.84
Darryl Johnson	4,667	3.78
Greg Frampton	2,644	2.14
Riley Murphy	1,337	1.08
Andrew Goodsell	855	0.69
Ross Rankin	854	0.69
Nolan Greenough	607	0.49
Alex Andreas	540	0.44
David Boyd	486	0.39
Bob Anders	448	0.36
Zoran Jokic	404	0.33
Ryan Dodge	229	0.19
Sean Dibbin	174	0.14

2021 Canadian federal election: Halifax
Party	Candidate	Votes	%	±%	Expenditures
Liberal	Andy Fillmore	21,905	42.74	+0.27	$103,501.55
New Democratic	Lisa Roberts	20,347	39.70	+9.66	$90,503.01
Conservative	Cameron Ells	6,601	12.88	+1.30	$2,924.56
Green	Jo-Ann Roberts	1,128	2.20	–12.17	$12,448.57
People's	B. Alexander Hébert	1,069	2.09	+0.95	$3,500.64
Communist	Katie Campbell	198	0.39	–	$0.00
Total valid votes/expense limit		51,248	99.38		$108,761.04
Total rejected ballots		322	0.62	–0.02	
Turnout		51,570	66.06	–6.96	
Registered voters		78,065			
Liberal hold		Swing		–4.70	
Source: Elections Canada

2019 Canadian federal election: Halifax
Party	Candidate	Votes	%	±%	Expenditures
Liberal	Andy Fillmore	23,681	42.48	−9.25	$77,935.01
New Democratic	Christine Saulnier	16,747	30.04	−6.09	$92,096.82
Green	Jo-Ann Roberts	8,013	14.37	+11.08	$46,730.72
Conservative	Bruce Holland	6,456	11.58	+2.97	none listed
People's	Duncan McGenn	633	1.14	–	none listed
Animal Protection	Bill Wilson	222	0.40	–	$2,719.51
Total valid votes/expense limit		55,752	99.36		$102,876.75
Total rejected ballots		361	0.64	+0.16	
Turnout		56,113	73.02	+0.40	
Eligible voters		76,843			
Liberal hold		Swing		-1.58	
Source: Elections Canada

2015 Canadian federal election: Halifax
Party	Candidate	Votes	%	±%	Expenditures
Liberal	Andy Fillmore	27,431	51.73	+26.08	$134,528.53
New Democratic	Megan Leslie	19,162	36.13	–15.49	$169,615.12
Conservative	Irvine Carvery	4,564	8.61	–9.41	$22,288.40
Green	Thomas Trappenberg	1,745	3.29	–1.10	$692.58
Marxist–Leninist	Allan Bezanson	130	0.25	-0.09	–
Total valid votes/expense limit		53,032	99.51		$204,329.68
Total rejected ballots		259	0.49		
Turnout		53,291	72.62		
Eligible voters		73,379			
Liberal gain from New Democratic		Swing		+20.78	
Source: Elections Canada
