= Harbourview, Nova Scotia =

Harbourview
- Neighbourhood
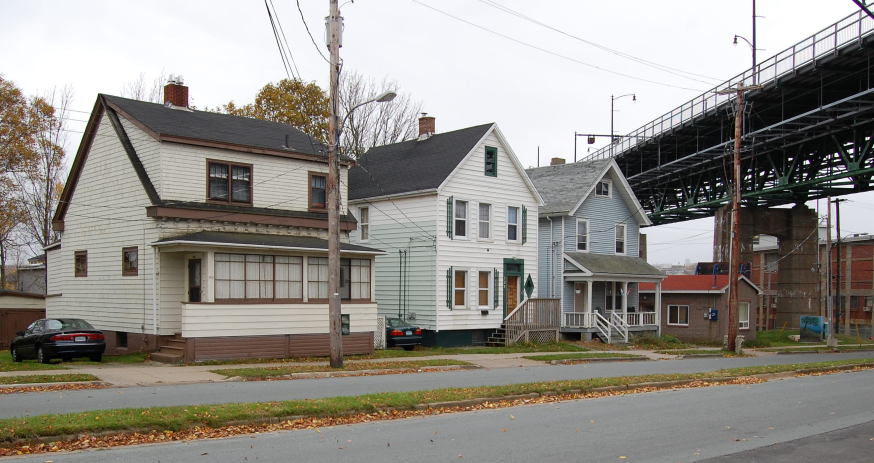
- Harbourview streetscape

- Location within Nova Scotia
- Coordinates: 44°41′08″N 63°30′29″W
- Country: Canada
- Province: Nova Scotia
- Municipality: Halifax Regional Municipality
- Community: Dartmouth
- Community council: Harbour East - Marine Drive Community Council
- District: 5 - Dartmouth Centre

Area
  - Total: 0.15 km^{2} (0.058 sq mi)
- Postal code: B3A
- Area code: 902

Harbourview is a 15 ha (37 acres) neighbourhood in Dartmouth, Nova Scotia. Located in central Dartmouth, it abuts the HRM Capital District and overlooks Halifax Harbour. The community is dominated by the Angus L. Macdonald Bridge, completed in 1955.

Major employers in Harbourview include the Harbourview Holiday Inn, Dartmouth Shopping Centre and the Defence Research and Development Canada (Atlantic).
