= Birch Cove, Halifax, Nova Scotia =

Human settlement and cove in city of Halifax, Nova Scotia, Canada

Coordinates: 44°41′02″N 63°40′23″W

Birch Cove (Mi'kmawi'simk: Mnikwaqnik) is a subdivision and a cove in the community of Halifax within the Halifax Regional Municipality in Nova Scotia, Canada, on the shore of Bedford Basin and along the Bedford Highway (Trunk 2).

The original place name of the Mi'kmaq, Mnikwaqnik, means "place where they get bark." The English-language name is after the birch trees that hung over the cove by William Donaldson, who named his estate Birch Cove.

== History ==
The Mi'kmaq used the area as a summer camping ground until the 1920s, there are also traces of an early Acadian village. A gravesite was uncovered in 1890 and scientific analysis proved they were actually Acadian soldiers.
