= 2004 Halifax municipal election =

The 2004 municipal elections of the Halifax Regional Municipality took place on October 16, 2004. Elections have been held every four years since the amalgamation of the cities of Halifax and Dartmouth, the town of Bedford and Halifax County into the Halifax Regional Municipality in 1996. The regional council is made up of twenty three councillors and one mayor, all positions were up for election.

There are no political parties at the municipal level in Nova Scotia, so all candidates run as independents. Voter turnout in the mayoral election was 48.39%.

== Results ==
=== Mayor ===
Candidate	Votes	%
Peter J. Kelly	102,865	82.3%
Mike Flemming	7,114	2.7%
Victor Syperek	12,746	4.9%
Ernie Brennan	2,310	0.9%
Total	125,035	100%
Source: Halifax Regional Municipality

=== Councillors ===
District 1: Eastern Shore - Musquodoboit Valley
Candidate	Votes	%	±
Randy Carter	600	11.83	
Martin Singh	740	14.59	
Steve Streatch	2,366	46.64	
Laurie Taylor	1,367	26.95	
Turnout	5,097	54.58	
