= Timberlea, Nova Scotia =

Community in Nova Scotia, Canada

Timberlea
- Location of Timberlea, Nova Scotia Timberlea (Canada)
- Coordinates: 44°39′20.5″N 63°44′4.6″W
- Country: Canada
- Province: Nova Scotia
- Municipality: Halifax
- Amalgamated with Halifax: 1 April 1996

Government

Area
  - Total: 6.72 km^{2} (2.59 sq mi)

Population (2021)
  - Total: 5,627
  - Density: 838/km^{2} (2,170/sq mi)
- Time zone: UTC−04:00 (AST)
  - Summer (DST): UTC−03:00 (ADT)
- Postal code span: B
- Area codes: 782, 902
- Part of a series about Places in Nova Scotia

Timberlea is a community located within the Municipality of Halifax in Nova Scotia, Canada.

Timberlea in Nova Scotia

== History ==
The community was first known as Nine Mile River after the river in the centre of the community which fed several early mills. In the mid-19th century, the St. Margaret's Bay Road was routed through the community. Several hotels were established to cater to travelers and later sportspeople and the Nine Mile River was crossed by an arched stone bridge, which survived until 2014 as one of the only surviving stone bridges in Nova Scotia.

After the arrival of the Halifax and Southwestern Railway in 1904, the community was referred to as Bowser's Station; after Angus Bowser. Angus Bowser ran a hotel near the area's train station near present-day Greenwood Heights.

In 1922, the community was renamed Timberlea to reflect the importance of the forest and lumbering. Aubrey Fraser was an early settler in the area, and he, his father and brothers stationed a saw mill along the Nine Mile River. Almost a decade following the Halifax Explosion, the Bowser's Hotel was sold to Mr. and Mrs. William Miller. It had been a frequent stop for people traveling along the St. Margaret's Bay Road, between the former City of Halifax and Yarmouth. On the night of 12 December 1947, the hotel was leveled in a fire.

Until the early 1990s, the community was a semi-rural, fairly close-knit community. Subsequently, several large developments such as Greenwood Heights have substantially increased the population, and it is now mostly a suburban community.

On 1 April 1996, Halifax County was dissolved and all of its places (cities, suburbs, towns, and villages) were turned into communities of a single-tier municipality named Halifax Regional Municipality. Subsequently, Timberlea was turned into a community within the new Municipality of Halifax.

In 2013, Iain Rankin of the Nova Scotia Liberal Party was elected as the member of the Legislative Assembly for Timberlea-Prospect. Iain won the seat in the 2013, 2017, 2021, and 2024 provincial elections.

In 2024 Janet Steele became the new Councillor for Halifax Municipal District 12, which includes the community of Timberlea.

== Geography ==
The community of Timberlea corresponds to Census Tract 2050142.01, and covers approximately 672 hectares (6.72 km^{2}) of land area. From 2016 to 2021, Timberlea's landmass increased by approximately 3 ha (7.4 acres).

Politically, Timberlea is a part of the Halifax Municipal District 12, and the Provincial Electoral District of Timberlea-Prospect.

== Demographics ==
Timberlea population history
Year	Pop.	±%
2016	5,497	—
2021	5,627	+2.4%

According to the 2021 Census Tract Map jointly released by the Government of the Municipality of Halifax—and—Statistics Canada, the population of the community of Timberlea was 5,627 people.

An increase of 130 people (approximately 2.4%) from the 2016 population of 5,497 people, the community's population density increased from 821 people per km^{2} to 838 people per km^{2}. Compared to the municipal average of approximately 80 people per km^{2}, Timberlea is over 10 times as dense as the average municipal population density.

== Parks, trails, and recreation ==
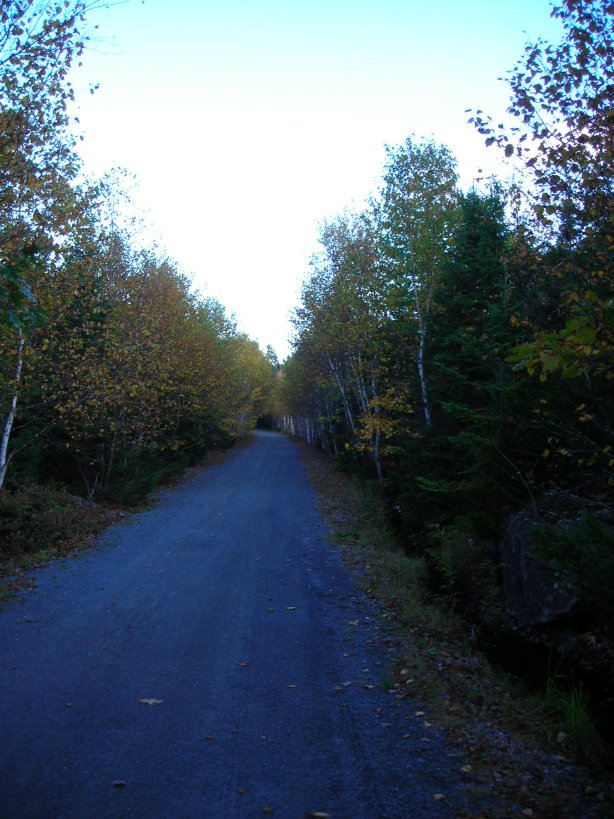
BLT-Trail near Timberlea.

The Beechville Lakeville Timberlea (BLT) Rails to Trails Association (see link below) has turned its 13 kilometres (8.1 mi) of the old Halifax and Southwestern Railway bed from Beechville to Hubley into a ATV/cycling/hiking rail trail which connects with a similar 32 kilometres (20 mi) stretch maintained by the similar St. Margaret's Bay organization.

The Bluff Trail, a 30 kilometres (19 mi) network of non-motorized wilderness trails, branches off the BLT Trail at Cranberry Lake. Swimming is available at Governor's Lake.

== Amenities ==
Timberlea is home to Beechville Lakeside Timberlea Elementary School which serves those three communities. The school is located between the Greenwood Heights and Glengarry Estates subdivisions.

In early 2018 it was announced Sobeys would open a new store at Exit 3 along Highway 103 to service Timberlea. In winter of 2019, the store opened—which raised the issue of the lack of public transit service to the store.

== Contemporary issues ==
There is discussion over preserving a substantially large area of crown land for a park near the lakes. Tentative plans are being discussed over the prospect of a community library, and construction and restoration of a "Fraser's Mill Museum", commemorating the saw mill at the source of Nine Mile River, which was once owned by the Fraser family. Loss of wilderness area and increasing suburban burdens have also fed opposition to Highway 113, a proposed highway connector from Timberlea.

== Newspaper ==
The BLT Insider monthly newspaper serves Beechville, Lakeside, Timberlea and surrounding communities. Combining local features, news, and sports that support the region's reliable local advertising source.
