= Mike Savage (politician) =

Lieutenant governor of Nova Scotia since 2024

His Honour the Honourable Mike Savage ONS
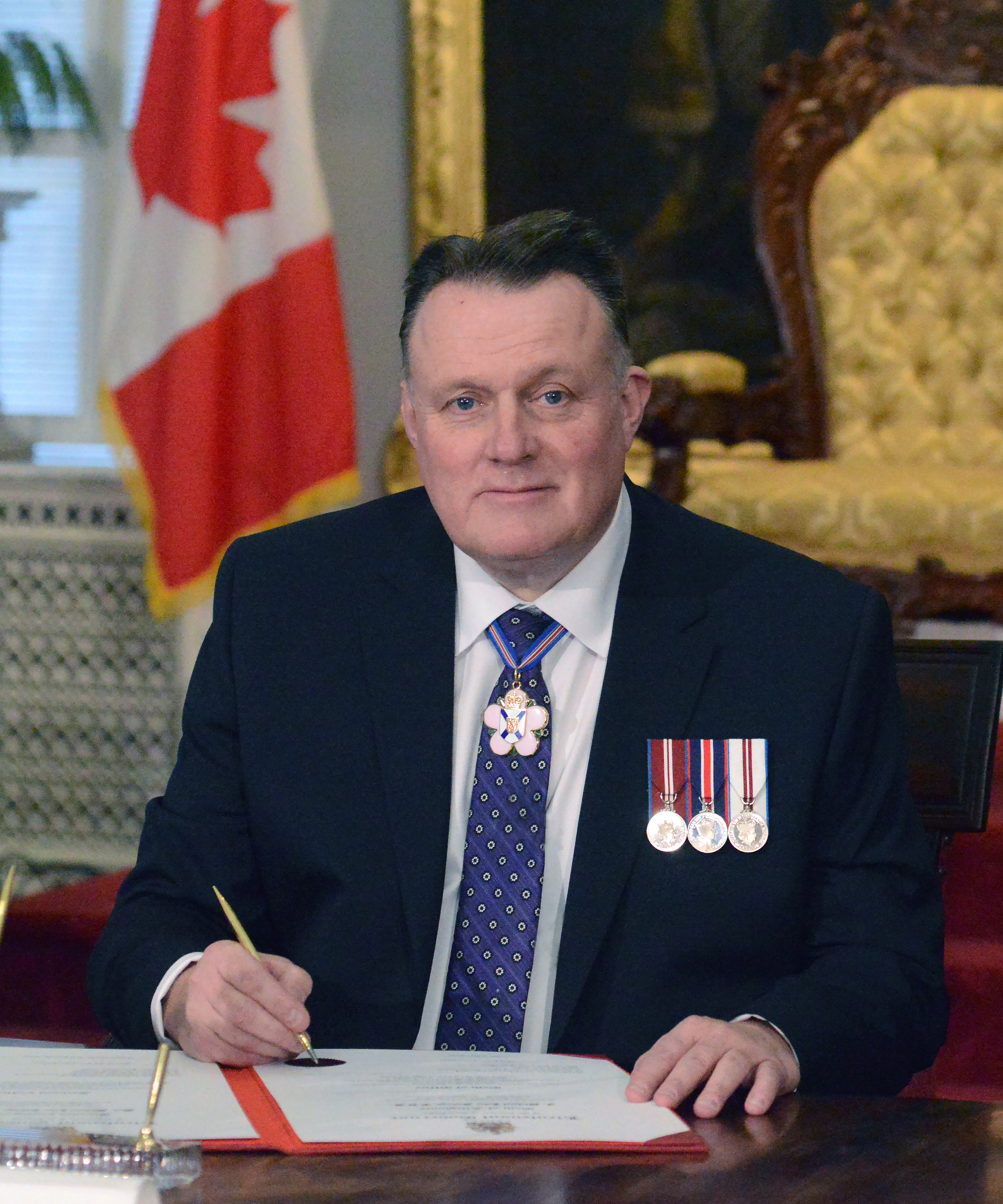
- Official portrait, 2024

34th Lieutenant Governor of Nova Scotia
- Incumbent
- Assumed office December 13, 2024
- Monarch: Charles III
- Governors General: Mary Simon; Louise Arbour
- Premier: Tim Houston
- Preceded by: Arthur LeBlanc

3rd Mayor of the Halifax Regional Municipality
- In office November 6, 2012 – November 5, 2024
- Preceded by: Peter J. Kelly
- Succeeded by: Andy Fillmore

Member of Parliament for Dartmouth—Cole Harbour
- In office June 28, 2004 – May 2, 2011
- Preceded by: Wendy Lill
- Succeeded by: Robert Chisholm

Personal details
- Born: Michael John Savage; May 13, 1960 (age 66) Belfast, Northern Ireland
- Party: Independent
- Other political affiliations: Liberal (until 2012)
- Parent: John Savage (father)
- Education: Bachelor of Arts (History)
- Alma mater: Dalhousie University
- Profession: Politician; businessman
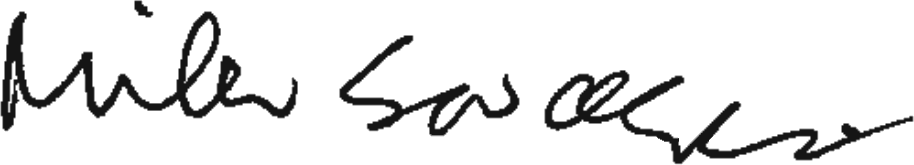
- Signature

Michael John Savage ONS (born May 13, 1960) is a Canadian politician who has served as the 34th lieutenant governor of Nova Scotia since 2024. The son of John Savage, he immigrated to Canada with his father from Belfast, Northern Ireland at the age of six. Savage served three terms as a Liberal member of Parliament for the riding of Dartmouth—Cole Harbour from 2004 to 2011, before serving three terms as the mayor of the Halifax Regional Municipality from 2012 to 2024. His appointment as lieutenant governor was announced by Prime Minister Justin Trudeau in October 2024.

== Early life and education ==
Savage was born on May 13, 1960, in Belfast, Northern Ireland, to parents Margaret and John Savage. He has six siblings: three brothers and three sisters. Savage spent his early years in South Wales before immigrating to Canada with his parents at the age of six, when his family began living in Dartmouth, Nova Scotia. He grew up in Dartmouth, graduating from Prince Andrew High School and later Dalhousie University with a Bachelor of Arts in history. His father John was the mayor of Dartmouth from 1985 to 1992, and the 23rd premier of Nova Scotia from 1993 to 1997.

== Career ==
=== Early career ===
After graduating from Dalhousie University, Savage spent the first two decades of his career working in business in Halifax. He worked as a general manager for S. Cunard & Co. from 1986 until 1997, when he became the sales and marketing director for Nova Scotia Power. Savage became vice-president of the corporate recruiting firm Knightsbridge Robertson Surrette in 2002.

Savage has served as president of the Heart and Stroke Foundation of Nova Scotia, and was a member of the board of directors of the IWK. He has been involved with community organizations such as the Red Cross, Literacy Nova Scotia, the Canadian National Institute for the Blind, and the Neptune Theatre board.

=== Political career ===
==== Member of Parliament ====
Savage began his career in politics when he ran in the riding of Dartmouth in the 1997 federal election. He finished second behind Wendy Lill of the New Democratic Party (NDP).

Savage was elected Member of Parliament for Dartmouth—Cole Harbour in June 2004. He served on the committee which worked to enact the Civil Marriage Act in 2005, which legalized same-sex marriage across Canada. He was re-elected in 2006 and 2008.

On December 4, 2006, it was reported that Savage was considering a run for the leadership of the Nova Scotia Liberal Party. On December 19, Savage announced that he would not seek the leadership.

On May 2, 2011, Savage was defeated in the federal election by Robert Chisholm of the NDP; his riding was the only one in Nova Scotia not to re-elect the incumbent candidate in that election. Savage said at the time that he was proud of the work he had accomplished in Parliament, stating "in six weeks [of the campaign], no one told me I was a rotten person. But I understand how politics works, and you accept the judgment of the voters." After losing his seat, Savage became the vice-president of the Halifax public relations company M5 Communications and worked again in the private sector before going on to run for Mayor of Halifax.

==== Mayor of Halifax ====
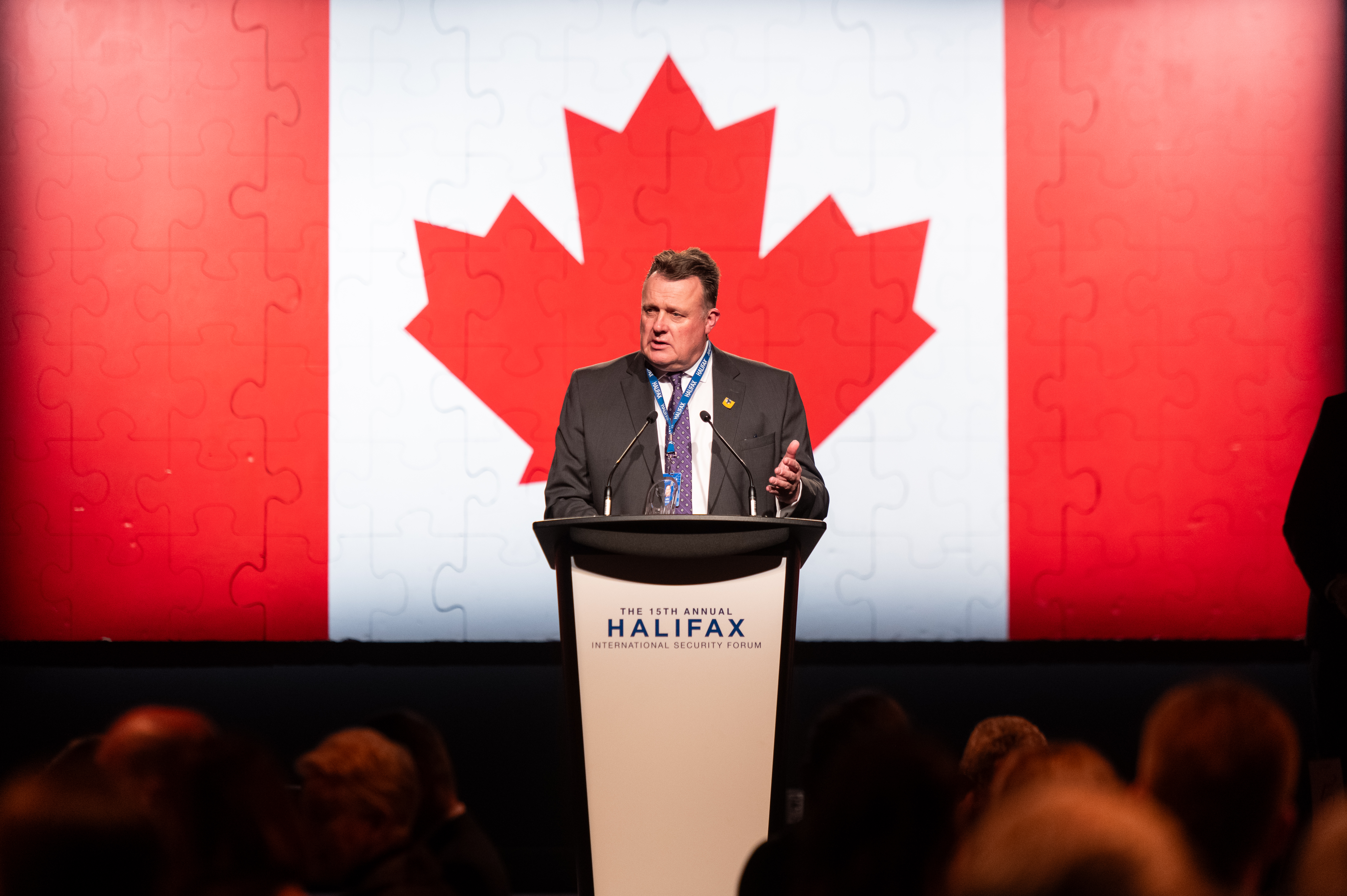
Savage at the 2023 Halifax International Security Conference during his time as mayor

On February 6, 2012, Savage announced that he would run for Mayor of Halifax Regional Municipality in that year's municipal elections. Savage was elected Mayor of Halifax on October 20, 2012, and sworn in on November 6. He was re-elected in the 2016 election and 2020 election.

During his time as Mayor, Savage supported a Canadian Football League (CFL) team coming to Halifax and construction of a corresponding stadium. By 2022 he was less optimistic about the prospects of a CFL team coming to Halifax, stating while there was interest from the CFL, getting a team in Halifax "just [isn't] going to happen the way we would have envisioned it five or six years ago." Savage suggested that construction of a stadium as originally conceived was no longer seen as desirable, and if the CFL were to come to Halifax it would more likely be in the Downtown area.

Savage has expressed a need for the federal government to provide more support to municipalities for housing. In 2023, as Mayor of Halifax and chair of the Big City Mayors' Caucus, he said that municipal governments were under significant financial pressure. Savage stated that although the federal government had accomplished a lot for Canadian cities, municipalities still required more support to meet goals for housing.

On February 13, 2024, Savage announced that he would not be running for a fourth term as mayor in the municipal elections later that year. In a speech at Halifax City Hall, he said being mayor of Halifax was "the best job [he] ever had". Savage discussed the improved relationship between the municipality and the Mi'kmaq community during his tenure, highlighting a key moment as council's decision to remove the statue of Edward Cornwallis. He was succeeded as mayor by Andy Fillmore on November 5, 2024.

=== Lieutenant governor ===
External videos
- Former Halifax mayor Mike Savage is sworn in as Nova Scotia’s 34th lieutenant-governor (1:00 min), The Canadian Press. Retrieved May 21, 2025 – via YouTube

On October 13, 2024, Prime Minister Justin Trudeau announced that Savage would be the next lieutenant governor of Nova Scotia, replacing Arthur LeBlanc. In preparation for the role, Savage held meetings with former lieutenant governors as well as former Governor General David Johnston. He was sworn in on December 13, 2024, and delivered his first throne speech (Note: Throne speeches in Nova Scotia are written by the government and delivered by the Lieutenant Governor at the beginning of every new session of the legislature.) when a new session of the legislature opened on February 14, 2025. As part of his role as lieutenant governor, Savage resides at Government House in Halifax and is responsible for conferring awards such as the Order of Nova Scotia and the King Charles III Coronation Medal.

== Personal life ==
Savage is married to his wife, Darlene Savage; they have two children. He met his wife during his second year of university at Dalhousie, and once remarked that the best gift he ever received was a pair of Frye boots gifted by her for their first Christmas together as a couple.

== Honours ==
Viceregal styles of Mike Savage (2024–present)
- Reference style: His Honour the Honourable; Son Honneur l'Honorable
- Spoken style: Your Honour; Votre Honneur

Ribbon bars of Mike Savage

Ribbon	Description	Notes
	Queen Elizabeth II Diamond Jubilee Medal	2012
	Queen Elizabeth II Platinum Jubilee Medal	2022
	King Charles III Coronation Medal	2024
	Order of Nova Scotia	2024
	Knight of the Order of Saint John	2024

== Electoral record ==
=== Municipal ===
2020 Halifax mayoral election
Candidate	Votes	%
Mike Savage	102,735	80.16
Matt Whitman	13,497	10.53
Total	128,160	100
Registered voters/turnout	322,232	39.77
Source: Halifax Regional Municipality

2016 Halifax mayoral election
Candidate	Votes	%
Mike Savage	62,096	68.38
Lil Macpherson	28,719	31.62
Total	90,815	100.00
Source: Halifax Regional Municipality

2012 Halifax mayoral election
Candidate	Votes	%
Mike Savage	63,547	57.75
Tom Martin	21,912	19.91
Fred Connors	20,277	18.43
Other candidates	4304	3.91
Total	110,040	100.00
Source: Halifax Regional Municipality

=== Federal ===
2011 Canadian federal election: Dartmouth—Cole Harbour
Party	Candidate	Votes	%	±%	Expenditures
New Democratic	Robert Chisholm	15,678	36.27	+4.73	$51,111.67
Liberal	Mike Savage	15,181	35.12	-4.37	$70,147.67
Conservative	Wanda Webber	10,702	24.76	+2.30	$51,126.57
Green	Paul Shreenan	1,662	3.85	-2.11	$0.00
Total valid votes/expense limit		43,223	99.41		$83,954.73
Total rejected, unmarked and declined ballots		255	0.59	-0.01	
Turnout		43,478	61.45	+2.72	
Eligible voters		70,756			
New Democratic gain from Liberal		Swing		+4.55	

2008 Canadian federal election: Dartmouth—Cole Harbour
Party	Candidate	Votes	%	±%	Expenditures
Liberal	Mike Savage	16,016	39.49	-2.83	$63,901.48
New Democratic	Brad Pye	12,793	31.55	-0.95	$56,900.80
Conservative	Wanda Webber	9,109	22.46	-0.36	$64,746.58
Green	Paul Shreenan	2,417	5.96	+3.69	$444.09
Christian Heritage	George Campbell	219	0.54	–	$351.78
Total valid votes/expense limit		40,554	100.0		$80,942
Total rejected, unmarked and declined ballots		245	0.60	+0.23	
Turnout		40,799	58.73	-3.71	
Eligible voters		69,469			
Liberal hold		Swing		-0.94	

2006 Canadian federal election: Dartmouth—Cole Harbour
Party	Candidate	Votes	%	±%	Expenditures
Liberal	Mike Savage	19,027	42.32	+0.25	$67,910.96
New Democratic	Peter Mancini	14,612	32.50	±0	$60,717.57
Conservative	Robert A. Campbell	10,259	22.82	+1.72	$41,775.58
Green	Elizabeth Perry	1,005	2.24	-0.92	$582.70
Marxist–Leninist	Charles Spurr	56	0.12	-0.05	none listed
Total valid votes/expense limit		44,959	100.0		$76,265
Total rejected, unmarked and declined ballots		166	0.37	-0.07	
Turnout		45,125	62.44	+0.51	
Eligible voters		72,264			
Liberal hold		Swing		+0.12	

2004 Canadian federal election: Dartmouth—Cole Harbour
Party	Candidate	Votes	%	±%	Expenditures
Liberal	Mike Savage	17,425	42.07	+8.18	$62,046.28
New Democratic	Susan MacAlpine-Gillis	13,463	32.50	-2.82	$59,335.19
Conservative	Michael L. MacDonald	8,739	21.10	-9.34	$54,707.19
Green	Michael Marshall	1,311	3.16	–	$200.00
Progressive Canadian	Tracy Parsons	415	1.00	–	$1,140.15
Marxist–Leninist	Charles Spurr	70	0.17	–	none listed
Total valid votes/expense limit		41,423	100.0		$73,009
Total rejected, unmarked and declined ballots		181	0.44		
Turnout		41,604	61.93		
Eligible voters		67,176			
Liberal notional gain from New Democratic		Swing		+5.50	
Changes from 2000 are based on redistributed results. Conservative Party change is based on the combination of Canadian Alliance and Progressive Conservative Party totals.

1997 Canadian federal election: Dartmouth—Cole Harbour
Party	Candidate	Votes	%	±%
New Democratic	Wendy Lill	12,326	32.57	+25.48
Liberal	Mike Savage	10,298	27.21	-23.60
Progressive Conservative	Rob McCleave	10,183	26.91	+3.33
Reform	John Cody	4,446	11.75	-3.87
Independent	Cliff Williams	438	1.16	-0.63
Natural Law	Claude Viau	156	0.41	-0.71
Total valid votes		37,847	100.00	
Change for Independent candidate Cliff Williams is shown based on his results as a National Party candidate in 1993.

== See also ==
- List of mayors of the Halifax Regional Municipality
- List of lieutenant governors of Nova Scotia

Order of precedence
Preceded by Charles III, King of Canada	Order of precedence in Nova Scotia as of 2025	Succeeded by Tim Houston, Premier of Nova Scotia
Preceded by Manon Jeannotte as Lieutenant Governor of Quebec	Order of Precedence of Canada as Lieutenant Governor of Nova Scotia	Succeeded by Louise Imbeault as Lieutenant Governor of New Brunswick
