= Halifax Regional Council =

Governing body in Nova Scotia, Canada

Type
- Type: Municipal council
- Term limits: None

History
- Founded: April 1, 1996
- Preceded by: Council of City of Halifax; Council of City of Dartmouth; Council of Town of Bedford; Halifax County Council
- New session started: 2020

Leadership
- Mayor of Halifax: Andy Fillmore since November 5, 2024
- Deputy Mayor: Cathy Deagle since November 28, 2023

Structure
- Seats: 16 plus Mayor
- Committees: Standing committees
- Length of term: 4 years
- Authority: Halifax Regional Municipality Charter, 2008
- Salary: Mayor $213,455.90; Deputy Mayor $113,968.85; Councillors $103,608.05

Elections
- Last election: 19 October 2024
- Next election: 2028

Motto
- E. Mari Merces

Meeting place
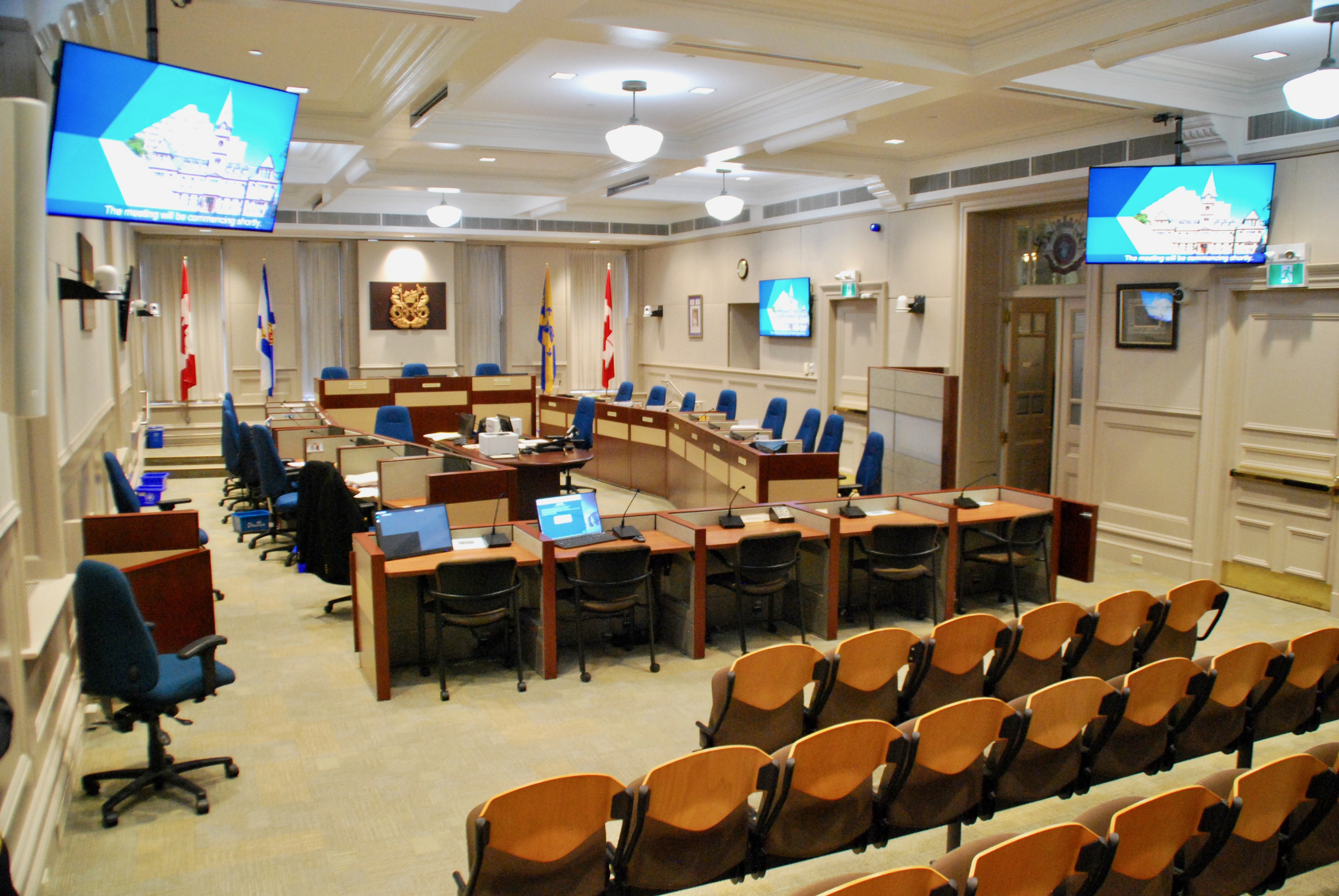
- Council Chambers; Halifax City Hall, Halifax, Nova Scotia

Website
- Halifax Regional Council

Halifax Regional Council (French: Conseil régional d'Halifax) is the governing body of Halifax, known as the Halifax Regional Municipality (HRM). Halifax is governed by a mayor-council system, where councillors are elected from sixteen geographic districts though a first-past-the-post system and the mayor is elected via a municipality-wide first-past-the-post vote. Halifax Regional Council was formed in 1996 and consisted of twenty-three councillors and one mayor. It was reduced in size to sixteen councillors and the mayor in 2012. The council meets at Halifax City Hall.

== Structure ==
The powers and authority of Halifax are laid out in the Halifax Regional Municipality Charter (2008). Halifax Regional Council has established standing committees, community councils and advisory committees to aid in policy development and decision making.

Standing committees are composed of councillors, and have responsibility over key functional areas of the municipality, such as transportation or the environment, and can propose, review, debate prior to forwarding reports to council with recommendations. Community councils are composed of councillors and have purview over development, land use, park and community issues in their geographic area, as well as appointments to standing committees. Advisory committees include councillors and citizens, and provide specific advice.

Generally each councillor sits on two standing committees, one or more external boards, and one or more advisory committees. The mayor is a member of all committees and is entitled to one vote. Residents can only make presentations to committees and community councils, not regional council, either through formal presentations prior to or public participation at the end of each meeting.

=== Standing Committees ===
There are six standing committees of Regional Council. Each committee has six members. The executive committee is composed of the Mayor, Deputy Mayor, and chair or designated representative appointed by each of the other five standing committees. The remaining five standing committees are appointed through a process that sees each community council appoint a representative to ensure geographic balance, and the remaining three members appointed by Council based on expressions of interest.

- Executive Standing Committee
- Appeals Standing Committee
- Audit & Finance Standing Committee
- Community Planning & Economic Development Standing Committee
- Environment & Sustainability Standing Committee
- Transportation Standing Committee

=== Advisory committees ===
There are eighteen advisory committees of Council, 12 appointed by Regional Council and reporting to it through the Standing Committees, and 6 appointed by and reporting to Community Councils.

==== Advisory Committees of Regional Council ====
- Accessibility Advisory Committee
- Active Transportation Advisory Committee
- Design Review Committee
- Grants Committee
- Heritage Advisory Committee
- Investment Policy Advisory Committee
- Special Events Advisory Committee

==== Advisory committees of community councils ====
- Point Pleasant Park Advisory Committee

=== Boards and commissions ===
There are two broad types of boards and commission to which HRM appoints Councillors and citizens. First, there are four boards of the regional municipality described by provincial statute that function as arms length boards delivering municipal services, or managing municipal assets. The second are external boards that have been established by other levels of government (Airport, Seaport, etc.), are organizations that HRM is a voluntary member of (UNSM, etc.) or via contract with HRM but are not subject to direct control by the municipality (Halifax Partnership, etc.).

==== Boards of Regional Municipality ====
- Halifax Board of Police Commissioners
- Halifax Regional Library Board
- Halifax Regional Water Commission
- Shubenacadie Canal Commission

==== External Board Appointments ====
- Alderney Landing
- Canadian Urban Transit Association
- Otter Lake Community Monitoring Committee
- Federation of Canadian Municipalities (National Board of Directors)
- Nova Scotia Federation of Municipalities
- Destination Halifax
- Halifax Partnership
- Halifax Harbour Bridges
- Halifax International Airport Authority Board
- Halifax Port Authority
- Events East

=== Community councils ===
A Community Council in Nova Scotia's Halifax Regional Municipality is a form of local government consisting of several councillors from the larger Halifax Regional Council. Community councils represent a geographic area covering anywhere from five to six municipal districts where councillors consider local matters, make recommendations to Halifax Regional Council, and provide opportunities for public input. The current community councils were adopted after the 2012 election.

== Current city council ==
=== Office of the Mayor ===
The Office of the Mayor is located on the third floor of Halifax City Hall. Staffing roles and hiring are directed by the Mayor with the support of the CAO. The current staff of the office consists of a Chief of Staff and several other support staff.

=== Councillors ===
The Council Support Office is located on the fourth floor of Halifax City Hall, with one remote office in Musquodoboit Harbour that is staffed part time, and other unstaffed offices in municipal buildings in some districts. Staffing roles and hiring are the responsibility of the Manager Council Support under the office of the CAO. The current staff of the office consists of nine full time and two part-time staff, including the manager.

District	Councillor
District 1 Waverley – Fall River – Musquodoboit Valley	Cathy Deagle Gammon
District 2 Preston – Chezzetcook – Eastern Shore	David Hendsbee
District 3 Dartmouth South – Eastern Passage	Becky Kent
District 4 Cole Harbour – Westphal	Trish Purdy
District 5 Dartmouth Centre	Sam Austin
District 6 Harbourview – Burnside – Dartmouth East	Tony Mancini
District 7 Peninsula South Downtown	Laura White
District 8 Peninsula North	Virginia Hinch
District 9 Armdale Peninsula West	Shawn Cleary
District 10 Halifax – Bedford Basin West	Kathryn Morse
District 11 Spryfield – Sambro Loop – Prospect Road	Patty Cuttell
District 12 Timberlea – Beechville – Clayton Park West	Janet Steele
District 13 Hammonds Plains – St. Margaret's	Nancy Hartling
District 14 Middle/Upper Sackville – Beaver Bank – Lucasville	John A. Young
District 15 Lower Sackville	Billy Gillis
District 16 Bedford – Wentworth	Jean St-Amand

=== Elections ===
Elections are held every four years on leap years. By-elections for council seats have been held in 1998, 1999, 2003, 2006, 2007, and 2019 after some regional councillors were elected to the provincial legislature.

An examination of boundaries took place throughout 2003/04 upon which there was a redistribution of districts. The 2004 municipal election saw the combination of two districts into one in Cole Harbour, as well as the creation of a new district in Clayton Park West.

==== Election results ====
- 2024 Halifax municipal election
- 2020 Halifax municipal election
- 2016 Halifax municipal election
- 2012 Halifax municipal election
- 2008 Halifax municipal election
- 2004 Halifax municipal election

== See also ==
- List of mayors of the Halifax Regional Municipality for a list of mayors for the Halifax Regional Municipality
  - List of mayors of Halifax, Nova Scotia for a list of mayors for the former City of Halifax, from 1841 - 1996.
  - List of mayors of Dartmouth, Nova Scotia for a list of mayors for the former City of Dartmouth, from 1873 - 1996.
  - List of mayors of Bedford, Nova Scotia for a list of mayors for the former Town of Bedford, from 1979 - 1996.
  - List of wardens of Halifax County, Nova Scotia for a list of wardens for former Halifax County, from 1879 - 1996.
