= Hammonds Plains, Nova Scotia =

Canadian suburban community

Hammonds Plains
- Suburban Community
- Location within Nova Scotia
- Country: Canada
- Province: Nova Scotia
- Municipality: Halifax
- Community: Hammonds Plains
- Municipal District: District 13 (Hammonds Plains-St. Margaret's)

Area
  - Total: 33.31 km^{2} (12.86 sq mi)
- Area code: 902

Hammonds Plains is a suburban area of the Halifax Regional Municipality in Nova Scotia, Canada, located 20 km northwest of Downtown Halifax.

== History ==
Hammonds Plains was established as a settlement for United Empire Loyalists in 1786 along a road running from Birch Cove on Bedford Basin to St. Margaret's Bay. Landowners voted to name the road after the popular outgoing Lt. Governor Andrew Snape Hamond. Further settlers arrived with disbanded soldiers from the Napoleonic Wars and Black Refugees from the War of 1812. The settlement was also the eastern end of the Old Annapolis Road intended to create a settled corridor and transportation link between Halifax and Annapolis Royal. While the Annapolis Road never developed, settlement opened up the a modest amount of viable farmland and more significantly developed many saw mills.

During the 1950s, Hammonds Plains was a potential location for a new international airport for Halifax, where the airport would've been constructed between the present day Glen Arbour Subdivision and Lucasville. The airport was ultimately built in Goffs, just south of Enfield, Nova Scotia.

== Geography ==
Hammonds Plains in Nova Scotia

The Government of Nova Scotia defines Hammonds Plains as adjacent to Bedford-and-Lucasville to the east; Upper Sackville-and-Middle Sackville to the north; Stillwater Lake, Timberlea, and Upper Tantallon to the south; and Upper Hammonds Plains to the west. The community is situated along the isthmus of the Chebucto Peninsula with its centre located along Highway 213 (Hammonds Plains Road).

The Hammonds Plains region is rich in small lakes and is a dormitory area for Halifax. Many homes lie on large unserviced lots, except in the Kingswood subdivision where 90% of the units have municipal water service and along the Hammonds Plains Road itself where there are several small businesses involved in automobile repair, waste management, physiotherapy clinics, and other maintenance activities. The population grew rapidly in the 1990s, particularly in subdivisions at the western end of the Hammonds Plains Road. Halifax's water comes from Pockwock Lake which lies north of Hammonds Plains. The landmass of Hammonds Plains is approximately 3,331 ha (8,230 acres).

=== Residential subdivisions ===
- Cedarwood
- Glen Arbour
- Highland Park
- Kingswood
- Kingswood North
- Maplewood
- Perry Pond
- Uplands Park
- Voyageur Lakes
- White Hills

== Activities ==
- Glen Arbour Golf Course, an 18-hole private championship golf course that hosts many tournaments, including the 2005 LPGA Canadian Women’s Open and the Telus World Skins Game in 2012.
- Hatfield Farm, a venue that contains a petting zoo and horseback riding, and is a popular spot for weddings and other functions.
- Atlantic Splash Adventure, a water park containing nine slides and several flat rides
- Splashifax, Halifax’s first-ever floating water park, offering outdoor fun for all ages.

An annual cycling event called Close To Home: The Tour of Hammonds Plains links the earliest settled areas with the new subdivisions.

== Demographics ==
Hammonds Plains is a well-established community—however—the demographic information available from Statistics Canada pertains to the settled area ("retired population centre") of Hammonds Plains Road, not the community of Hammonds Plains.

The settled area ("retired population centre") of Hammonds Plains Road had a population of 1,819 people living in 595 of its 602 total private dwellings as of 2021, a decrease of −2.2% from 1,859 people in 2016. Hammonds Plains Road had a population density of 572 people per km^{2}.

== Transportation ==
Halifax Transit's route 433 serves Hammonds Plains. This route travels from Tantallon, passes through Hammonds Plains, and continues to the Lacewood Terminal in Clayton Park. At Lacewood Terminal, passengers can transfer to buses destined for other areas of Halifax.

== Education ==
Schools that service residents of Hammonds Plains include:

Services Blue Mountain Estates, Kingswood, and Kingswood North

- Charles P. Allen High School (Bedford)
- Kingswood Elementary School
- Madeline Symonds Middle School

Services Cedarwood, Glen Arbour, Highland Park, Maplewood, and White Hills

- Charles P. Allen High School (Bedford)
- Hammonds Plains Consolidated School
- Madeline Symonds Middle School

== Notable residents ==
- Andrew Bodnarchuk, professional hockey player
- Bruce Guthro, musician
- Brad Marchand, professional hockey player for the Florida Panthers
