= Upper Hammonds Plains Volunteer Fire Department =

Fire department of the Halifax Regional Municipality

Operational area
- Country: Canada
- Province: Nova Scotia
- City: Halifax

Agency overview
- Established: 1966

The Upper Hammonds Plains Volunteer Fire Department was the local authority fire and rescue service for the historic African Nova Scotian community of Upper Hammonds Plains in Halifax County and its surrounding area. In the 1960s, the UHP Volunteer fire department became the first all-Black volunteer fire department in Canada's history.

== History ==
The first-ever all-Black volunteer fire department in Canada was established in 1966 and officially incorporated in the 1970s, operating within Halifax County, Nova Scotia.

It was established in the Upper Hammonds Plains community located in the Canadian province of Nova Scotia. Concerns grew following a series of fires in the community and how the emergencies were handled due to tensions between African Nova Scotians and white communities. African Nova Scotias in Upper Hammonds Plains experienced inconsistent service standards or denial of service. Driven by the need to address the discrimination, community members organized a meeting in 1964 to discuss the possibility of establishing their own volunteer fire service. The initiative gained further traction after a local resident, Elizabeth Mantley, donated a parcel of land. The men of the community took it upon themselves to build a fire hall and established an all-Black volunteer fire department to protect their community due to the lack of emergency services in the area.

=== Operations ===
By the end of 1966, the department was formed with forty-eight members. The members of the Upper Hammonds Plains Volunteer Fire Department Ladies Auxiliary played a vital role in raising funds for equipment and general operations through fundraising initiatives. The department's responsibilities extended beyond traditional firefighting. The volunteer firefighters also responded to various emergency calls, including those for people experiencing heart attacks or asthma attacks.

== Fire Station ==
The fire hall's original two-bay door concrete structure was built by local African Nova Scotian residents on 948 Pockwock Road in Upper Hammonds Plains, Nova Scotia. The official opening of the hall that housed the Upper Hammonds Plains Volunteer Fire Department occurred in 1970. George Smith was among the attendees at the hall's official unveiling ceremony.

The all-Black department provided voluntary services to the community until the 1996 Amalgamation of the Halifax Regional Municipality, at which point, as part of a broader regional reorganization, Upper Hammonds Plains and several other fire departments in Halifax County were merged to establish the Halifax Regional Fire and Emergency Service. Its members became integrated with the members of Station 50 in what was formerly Lower Hammonds Plains. Under Fire & Emergency Services, the building was designated as Fire Station #51 Upper Hammonds Plains.

=== Station Closure ===
In 2012, Halifax Regional Fire and Emergency Service reviewed their operations, leading to the decommissioning of five volunteer fire stations, including Upper Hammonds Plains's Fire Station #51 in the subsequent year. This decision was made due to factors like a shortage of volunteers, low call volume, and the potential for operational consolidation. The fire hall remained in service as the Halifax Regional Fire Station #51 until 2013.

=== Land ===
When Station #51 shut down, the land and fire hall building stayed with the Halifax Regional Municipality. As the original volunteer fire department was not formally incorporated until the late 1970s, it was ineligible to hold property rights at the time of donation. Consequently, Halifax County held the deed for the property in the Upper Hammonds Plains area. In 2020, the Upper Hammonds Plains Community Development Association proposed a Creative Arts & Recreation Facility for the community's youth at the site of the vacant fire hall. The Halifax Regional Council voted to return the land to the association for a dollar. After the transfer of ownership, the building was renamed The Elizabeth Mantley Arts & Recreation Centre honouring the local resident behind the original land donation.
