= Kingswood Elementary School =

Kingswood Elementary School may refer to:

- Kingswood Elementary School (British Columbia), an elementary school in Richmond, BC
- Kingswood Elementary School (Nova Scotia), an elementary school in Hammonds Plains, NS
- Kingswood Elementary School (Cary, North Carolina), an elementary school in Cary, NC
