= Old Annapolis Road, Nova Scotia =

Road in Nova Scotia, Canada

The Old Annapolis Road was a planned direct route between Halifax and Annapolis Royal, the current and former capitals of Nova Scotia, in Eastern Canada. Work began in 1784 and was resumed in 1816 as a military settlement plan for Napoleonic War veterans. Known various times as the Annapolis Military Road, the Dalhousie Road and the Kempt Road, it led to some successful settlements but was never completed and was abandoned in 1829. Some disconnected sections remain in use today.

== Historical context ==
Annapolis Royal was the original colonial capital of Nova Scotia, until the founding of Halifax in 1749. In the late 18th and early 19th century it remained a commercial center and an important fortified garrison for Western Nova Scotia. It was also the principal gateway to New Brunswick by sea. Transportation between Halifax and Annapolis Royal was by a lengthy and indirect route known as the "Post Road" or "Great Western Road" which followed ancient trails from Halifax to Windsor, and then West through roads linking the Acadian settlements of the Annapolis Valley. Approximately the same route is followed by Nova Scotia Highway No. 1 today. The Old Annapolis Road was an attempt to quickly connect Annapolis Royal with Halifax and open up the interior for settlement. It was the most ambitious of several roads built in the late 18th century to connect Atlantic coast settlements to Annapolis Royal through the interior of Nova Scotia. Other examples were the equally unsuccessful and identically named "Old Annapolis Road" from Shelburne to Annapolis Royal, started in 1785 but abandoned by 1814, and the Liverpool to Annapolis Royal Road built in the 1790s, parts of which later grew to become Nova Scotia's Highway No. 8.

== Geography ==
The interior of Nova Scotia consists of thick forest, extensive swamps and thin soils with only the occasional pocket of marginally fertile soil. In the early 19th century, the interior, while crossed by long-established Mi'kmaw travel routes was uninhabited by European settlers. The route of the Halifax to Annapolis Royal road was varied to make areas of potentially-better farmland more accessible.

Work began on surveying a new road from Halifax to Annapolis Royal as early as 1776. In 1784 a new survey was conducted to plan a new route through the wilderness between the two cities, with the intention of reducing travel time - particularly for the movement of troops - and opening up the land for settlement. The route had the potential to reduce the distance between Halifax and Annapolis Royal by a third and avoid the major tidal river crossings of the Post Road through Windsor.

== Construction ==
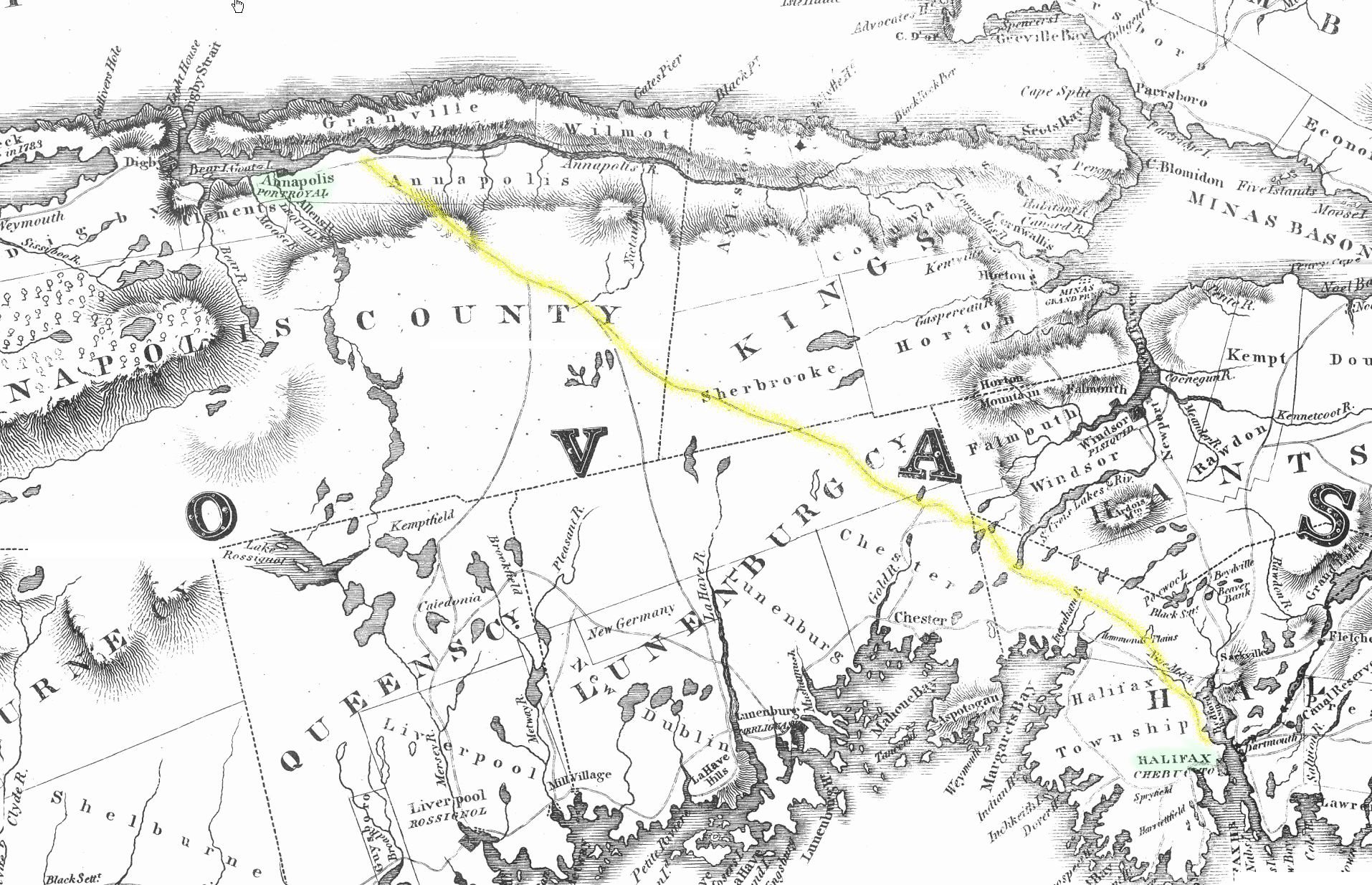
1829 map showing the entire route of the road.

Road building commenced in 1784. After a few miles had been constructed at the Western (Annapolis Royal) end of the road, work ceased. In 1816 construction resumed, with portions of the road slightly relocated to provide access of land considered more suitable for settlement. Land lots were laid out along the road in three main settlement areas surveyed for army veterans, each named after British generals of the Napoleonic Wars: Dalhousie, Sherbrooke and Wellington. Considerable progress was made in the West, where the road connected the Dalhousie settlements with Sherbrooke - today known as New Ross - approximately halfway along the intended route. The road continued eastward to the smaller military settlement of Sherwood, but east of Sherwood, the hostile terrain proved too difficult and while the route was cleared to Halifax, construction along the eastern gap faltered.

Some construction had been completed at the Halifax end which began at the Hammonds Plains Road and which led to the Bedford Highway near Kearney Lake. Settlements by Black Refugees from the War of 1812 were successful along the first stretch of the Annapolis Road nearest Halifax which later became known as the Pockwock Road. West of Hammonds Plains, the road led to the army veterans settled in the Wellington Military Settlement stretching from Pockwock Lake to Panuke Lake, but the swamps, thin soil and boulder-covered land made farming unproductive. Saw mills and lumber camps developed, but Wellington was largely abandoned after major forest fires in the 1860s. Some small farms, saw mills and lumber camps continued in the area near Rafter Lake closer to Halifax which became known as Kempt Town after General James Kempt who tried to complete the road in the 1820s. The last residents left the Wellington/Kemp Town area in the 1920s. Further west, the road was never completed or settled. The gap between New Ross and Hammonds Plains remained a bridle path for horses in the summer and for sleighs in the winter. The Nova Scotia government continued to invest annual funds to complete the road as late as 1829. While the road was never completed for wagon traffic, it saw some use by horseback and foot traffic and was used for the delivery of mail between Halifax and Annapolis in the first part of the 19th century. In 1828, a 63 year old widow from Westport, Brier Island named Margaret Davis walked from Annapolis Royal to Halifax along the old Annapolis Road to resolve a land dispute and obtain a deed for her family's land on Brier Island.

== The road today ==
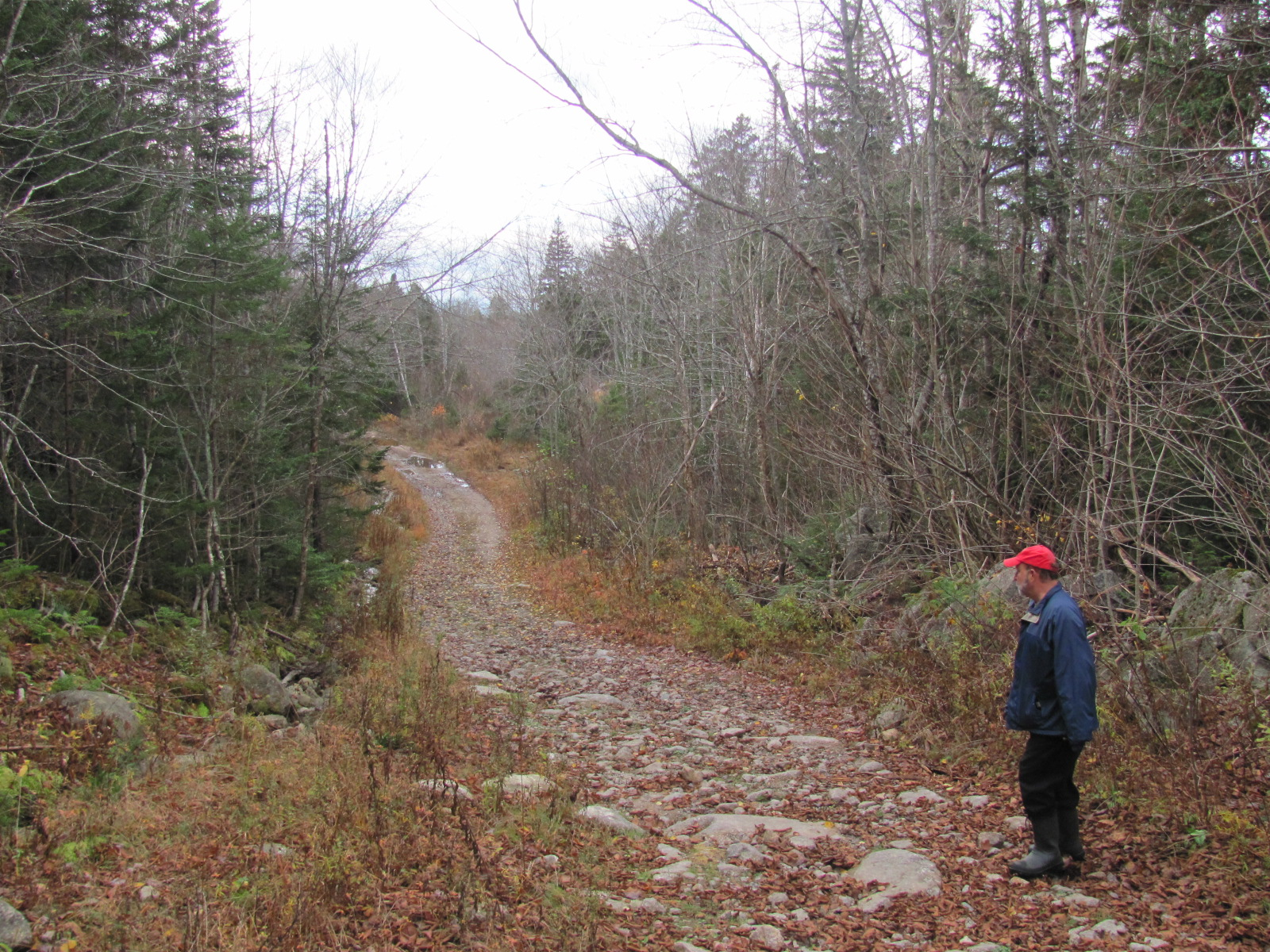
Halifax end of the Old Annapolis Road near Hammonds Plains

Sections of the western end of the road remain in use, known today as the West Dalhousie Road from Annapolis Royal which follows approximately the same route as that surveyed in 1784 and includes communities that grew along the road such as West Dalhousie and Albany Cross. A short section of Nova Scotia Trunk 10 follows the route of the Old Annapolis Road while the East Dalhousie Road and the Forties Road continued the route through the communities of Dalhousie Road, Forties Settlement to New Ross. A short section of the road is inhabited at Sherwood near Card Lake at the intersection of Highway 14. Further east, only sections of construction still exist as the alignment of several local road segments such as the Pockwock Road and the Kempt Town Road (present day Kempt Road in Halifax) as well as logging roads and trails. Portions of the road near Pockwock at Wright's Lake and at Rafter Lake were submerged in 1922 when the lakes were raised by dams built for the St. Margaret's Bay Hydroelectric System. Some original road alignments and roadbed of the Old Annapolis Road have been identified by archaeologists along the Hammonds Plains Road. One section of the road near Halifax was developed by the Bowater Mersey Paper company as the Old Annapolis Road Hiking Trail, officially opened on 16 August 1975, and has been popular with hikers, although it was abandoned by the paper company in 2012.
