= Halifax Water =

Municipal utility in Halifax, Nova Scotia, Canada

Halifax Regional Water Commission

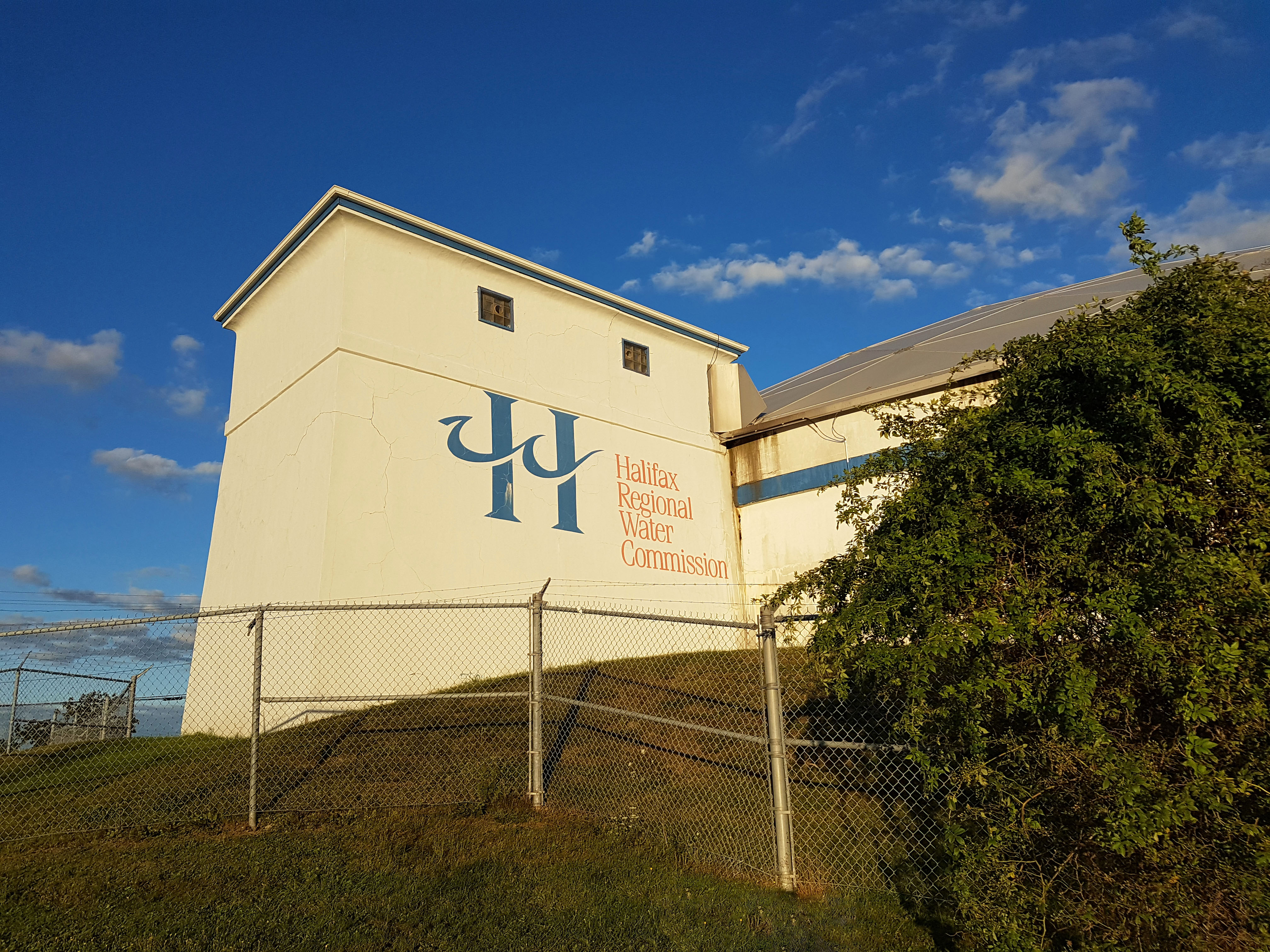
- The Robie Street Reservoir in Halifax

Agency overview
- Formed: Water: 1945; Wastewater & Stormwater: 2007
- Preceding agencies: Halifax Water Commission; Public Service Commission
- Headquarters: 450 Cowie Hill Road Halifax, Nova Scotia
- Employees: 400
- Annual budget: $135 million (2015)
- Agency executives: Kenda MacKenzie, General Manager; John MacPherson, Board Chair
- Parent agency: Halifax Regional Municipality
- Website: www.halifaxwater.ca

The Halifax Regional Water Commission (HRWC), publicly known as Halifax Water, is the municipal water, wastewater and stormwater utility serving the residents of the Halifax Regional Municipality (HRM), pursuant to the Public Utilities Act. An autonomous, self-financed utility, Halifax Water is a fully metered water utility providing water, fire protection, wastewater and stormwater services as regulated by the Nova Scotia Utility and Review Board.

== History ==
Although the commission's present structure has existed since 1945, its creation was rooted to earlier events. The water system began in 1844 with the formation of the Halifax Water Company, a private firm under contract to the City of Halifax who hired the engineer Charles Fairbanks to survey the lakes around the city and New York engineer John Jarvis to design the system. It began operation in 1848, using a gravity-fed main to deliver water from the Chain Lakes and Long Lake system just west of the city to downtown Halifax where it supplied public fountains, private customers and fire hydrants. In 1861, after concerns about reliability following water shortages during a major fire, the water supply system was purchased by the City from the private company and operated as a public utility in one form or another for 75 years. As with any growing metropolis throughout the last century, the former City of Halifax had struggled to meet the ever-increasing demands of its residents for clean, safe drinking water. The system grew by adding capacity from connections to additional lakes without resolving its maintenance and wastage problems.

Ravaged by environmental abuse associated with the Great Depression and two world wars, Halifax's water supply deteriorated to a critical condition by 1943. Responding to a government-commissioned report on the need for a complete overhaul of the system, the City, on January 1, 1945, formed the Public Service Commission (renamed the Halifax Water Commission in 1987) to operate and manage the water utility.

Eight years later, in 1952, the Water Commission purchased the assets of the water utility outright from the City to ensure that the utility operated in a business-like manner. This business-like approach has enabled the HWC to continually improve and upgrade the water supply system by funding operational and capital expenditures directly from potable water and fire protection revenue, without any financial assistance from the municipal government.

In 1977, the Pockwock water supply system was brought on line. The debt for the Pockwock system was retired in the year 2000.

On April 1, 1996, as a result of metro amalgamation, the Dartmouth and Halifax County water utilities were merged with the Halifax Water Commission, bringing with it, new challenges and opportunities. In response to a pressing need for high quality water in the Dartmouth area, the Commission constructed a new water treatment plant at Lake Major and associated transmission system. The project was completed in December, 1998.

On August 1, 2007, the Commission expanded its mandate once again with the transfer of HRM's wastewater and stormwater assets to Halifax Water, and becoming the first regulated water and wastewater/stormwater utility in Canada.

The most recent exciting opportunity arose in 2013 when HRWC filed claims to the UARB for urgent and long-overdue upgrades and a 30% rate hike (11.2% in 2013 and 16.7% in 2014 for a cumulative increase of 29.8%).

== Water supply system ==
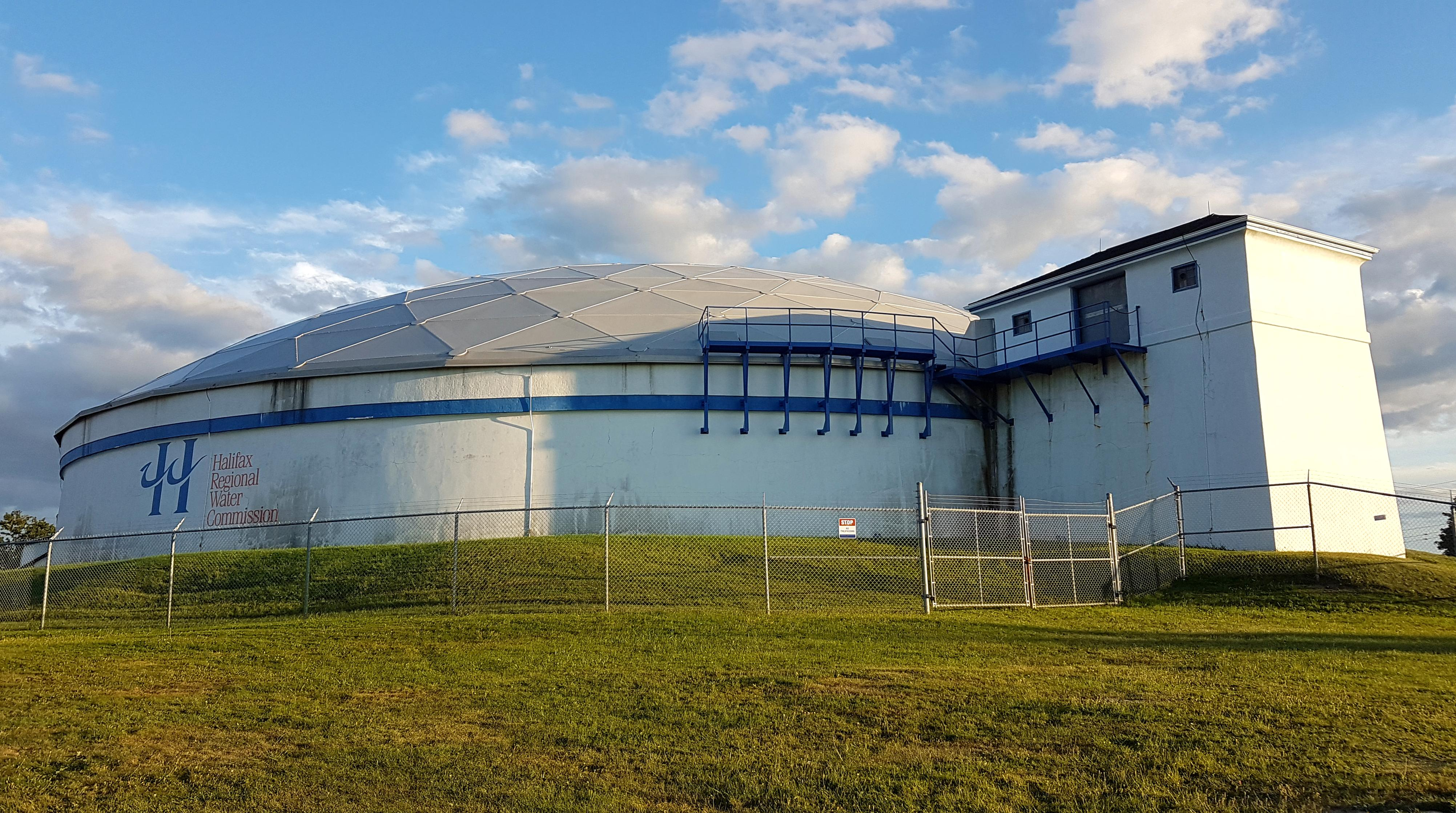
The Robie Street Reservoir was built in 1913.

- 3 water supply plants
  - J. Douglas Kline Water Supply Plant (Pockwock) was commissioned in 1977 and uses a direct dual media filtration process. Plant capacity is 227,000,000 litres/day (50 Million igpd) and serves the communities of Halifax, Bedford, Lower Sackville, Fall River, Waverley and Timberlea.
  - Lake Major Water Supply Plant was commissioned in 1999 and uses a sedimentation with multi-media filtration process. Plant capacity is 94,000,000 litres/day (20 Million igpd) and serves the communities of Dartmouth, Eastern Passage, Cole Harbour and Westphal.
  - Bennery Lake Water Supply Plant was commissioned in 1987 and uses a direct filtration process. Plant capacity is 7,950,000 litres/day (1.75 Million igpd) and serves the Halifax Stanfield International Airport and Aerotech Business Park.
- 5 isolated systems
  - Five Island Lake was commissioned in 1994 and serves Five Island Lake
  - Collins Park was commissioned in 2010 and serves Wellington
  - Middle Musquodoboit was commissioned in 2010 and serves Middle Musquodoboit.
  - Silver Sands was acquired in 1999 and serves Cow Bay.
  - Miller Lake was acquired in 2002 and serves Fall River.
- 18 storage reservoirs
- over 1,500 km of distribution mains
- 21 pump stations
- over 8,400 fire hydrants
- over 84,000 customers

== Wastewater and stormwater system ==
- 14 wastewater treatment facilities
- 167 pumping stations
- over 2,300 km of collection mains
- over 38,000 manholes
- over 24,000 catchbasins
- 45 retention ponds/holding tanks
- approximately 16,000 driveway culverts
- approximately 600 km of ditches
- over 81,000 customers receiving wastewater service
- over 100,000 customers receiving stormwater service
