= Brad Farynuk =

Canadian professional ice hockey player

- Born: January 22, 1982 (age 44) Enderby, British Columbia, Canada
- Height: 6 ft 0 in (183 cm)
- Weight: 215 lb (98 kg; 15 st 5 lb)
- Position: Defense
- Shoots: Left
- ALH team Former teams: Tohoku Free Blades; Syracuse Crunch; Springfield Falcons; Quad City Flames
- Playing career: 2006–present

Brad Farynuk (born January 22, 1982) is a Canadian former professional ice hockey player who last played with Tohoku Free Blades. He played over 300 professional hockey games (53 games in the American Hockey League, 175 in the ECHL, and 148 in the ALH).

== Playing career ==
After captaining the final two years and graduating from Rensselaer Polytechnic Institute (Troy, NY) with a dual engineering degree Brad went on to play professional hockey in Dayton Ohio for the Dayton Bombers. During the season he split his time with the Syracuse Crunch. The following year Farynuk played in California for the Stockton Thunder. There he was Captain and an ECHL All Star. Again, during the season he split his time with the AHL and played 20 games for the Springfield Falcons.

In the 2008-09 season, Brad was the Captain for the South Carolina Stingrays and led them to win the Kelly Cup Championship. The AHL's Quad City Flames had Brad playing in 17 games that season.

In 2009 Farynuk went and played for a new team in the Asia Hockey League called the Tohoku Free Blades. He was voted the Best Offensive Defender. In 2010 he returned to Hachinohe, Aomori, Japan with his wife to play for the Free Blades again. The team was scheduled to play in the Championship but the day before game 1, disaster struck Japan. They experienced a devastating earthquake and tsunami forcing the league to cancel the rest of playoffs. The league named both teams (Halla and FreeBlades) co-champions for the 2010-2011 season.

In 2011 Brad played in the Italian League for Renon. Then in the 2012-2013 season Farynuk returned to Japan for a third season. The team won playoffs and were Asia League Champions. The following season Brad played for the FreeBlades again as assistant captain. In 2014-2015 Farynuk returned to the Free Blades for his fifth season and was once again the assistant captain.

== Career stats ==
			Regular season					Playoffs
Season	Team	League	GP	G	A	Pts	PIM	GP	G	A	Pts	PIM
1999–00	Vernon Vipers	BCHL	22	1	4	5	12	18	1	3	4	22
2000–01	Vernon Vipers	BCHL	60	9	32	41	43	—	—	—	—	—
2001–02	Vernon Vipers	BCHL	53	19	40	59	70	—	—	—	—	—
2002–03	R.P.I.	ECAC	39	3	12	15	20	—	—	—	—	—
2003–04	R.P.I.	ECAC	39	6	17	23	54	—	—	—	—	—
2004–05	R.P.I.	ECAC	38	5	16	21	36	—	—	—	—	—
2005–06	R.P.I.	ECAC	30	4	16	20	34	—	—	—	—	—
2006–07	Dayton Bombers	ECHL	47	4	19	23	54	22	4	12	16	20
2006–07	Syracuse Crunch	AHL	16	0	1	1	8	—	—	—	—	—
2007–08	Stockton Thunder	ECHL	28	3	12	15	41	6	0	3	3	10
2007–08	Springfield Falcons	AHL	20	0	4	4	18	—	—	—	—	—
2008–09	South Carolina Stingrays	ECHL	50	11	20	31	85	22	4	10	14	28
2008–09	Quad City Flames	AHL	17	1	2	3	12	—	—	—	—	—
2009–10	Tohoku Free Blades	AL	36	11	32	43	128	—	—	—	—	—
2010–11	Tohoku Free Blades	AL	34	12	24	36	74	5	3	5	8	6
2011–12	AS Renon	ITL	42	8	17	25	44	—	—	—	—	—
2012–13	Tohoku Free Blades	AL	38	16	27	43	86	8	5	5	10	12
2013–14	Tohoku Free Blades	AL	40	8	22	30	84	—	—	—	—	—
2014–15	Tohoku Free Blades	AL	42	16	29	45	139	7	1	7	8	4
AL totals			190	63	134	197	511	20	9	17	26	22
ECHL totals			125	18	51	69	180	50	8	25	33	58
AHL totals			53	1	7	8	38	—	—	—	—	—
