= Tohoku Free Blades =

Asia League Ice Hockey in Aomori Prefecture, Japan

- City: Hachinohe, Aomori
- League: Asia League Ice Hockey
- Founded: 2008; 18 years ago
- Operated: 2008–present
- Home arena: Flat Hachinohe
- Colours
- Owner: Xebio Co. Ltd.
- General manager: Keisuke Araki
- Head coach: Chris Wakabayashi
- Captain: Go Tanaka
- Website: www.freeblades.jp

The Tohoku Free Blades (東北フリーブレイズ) are an Asia League Ice Hockey team based in Hachinohe, Aomori, Japan.

== Community contributions ==
The team has a number of community programs it runs under the mantra of "Team Social Responsibility". The team engages in youth oriented activities like running skating schools, working with high-school teams, visiting schools to interact with kids, and other kinds of junior hockey workshops. The team also attends various festivals and events in the communities in which they play.

== Arena ==
The team plays mainly out of several rinks, including Niida Indoor Rink in Hachinohe City. The rink was completed in 1984 and renovated in 2002. It features an ice surface 30m wide by 60m long and seats 1,576 people. In the 2010–2011 season, the Free Blades played games as the home team out of the Shin-Yokohama Skate Center, which is the Seibu Prince Rabbits old home arena. The team also played games in Morioka Ice Arena in Morioka, Iwate, Bandai Atami Ice Arena in Kōriyama, Fukushima, and Higashi-Fushimi Ice Arena in Nishitōkyō, Tokyo. The team previously used Misawa Ice Arena in Misawa, Aomori, for some home games.

== Team colors and mascot ==
=== Logo ===
The Free Blades' logo consists of the word Free Blades written on two lines as solid blue letters with a light blue and white outline. The L is replaced with a hockey stick and a puck is featured at the end of the word "Blades". The text is set on a pair of white wings. It is also stylized with the "B" and "S" having extended points and the "S" also featuring a sweeping bottom stroke. All letters are capitalized.

=== Jerseys ===
Both the home and away jerseys feature silver on the shoulders and arms. The home jersey features a silver and blue panel along the side of the body while the away jersey features a solid white panel. The away jersey has a silver and green ring around the bottom while the home jersey features no ring. The home jerseys feature thin silver, green and white rings around the elbows, and the away jerseys have a single thick green ring. The logo is set in the middle of the chest and the jerseys have sponsor logos on top and in front of the shoulders. Additional sponsorship logos appear on the lower back of the jersey. The home jersey has a solid dark blue core and the away jersey has a solid white core.

=== Mascot ===
The Free Blades mascot is a white horse with light blue hair. The horse has an aggressive look and features blue eyes as well as two upward pointed ears. The hair is light blue and stringy pointed in several directions. The mascot wears the away jersey, which features additional blue panelling under the arms, and has two white wings attached on the back. The mascot is named "Blazey."

=== History ===
Founded in 2008, they played their first Asia League season in 2009–10. The Free Blades have been one of the more successful teams since its creation, winning three Asia League titles (2011, 2013, 2015).

== Year-by-year record ==
complete records for previous seasons

Season	GP	W	W(OT)	W(GWS)	L(GWS)	L(OT)	L	GF	GA	PTS	Finish	Playoffs
2009–10	36	13	0	4	1	0	18	132	142	48	5th/7	Did not reach playoffs
2010–11	36	18	1	3	2	4	8	160	112	68	3rd/7	Won Co-Championship
2011–12	36	13	3	1	4	1	4	106	111	52	6th/7	Did not reach playoffs
2012–13	42	24	0	2	3	3	13	187	141	73	2nd/7	Won Championship
Totals	150	68	4	10	10	8	43	585	506	-	-	2 Championships

== Roster ==
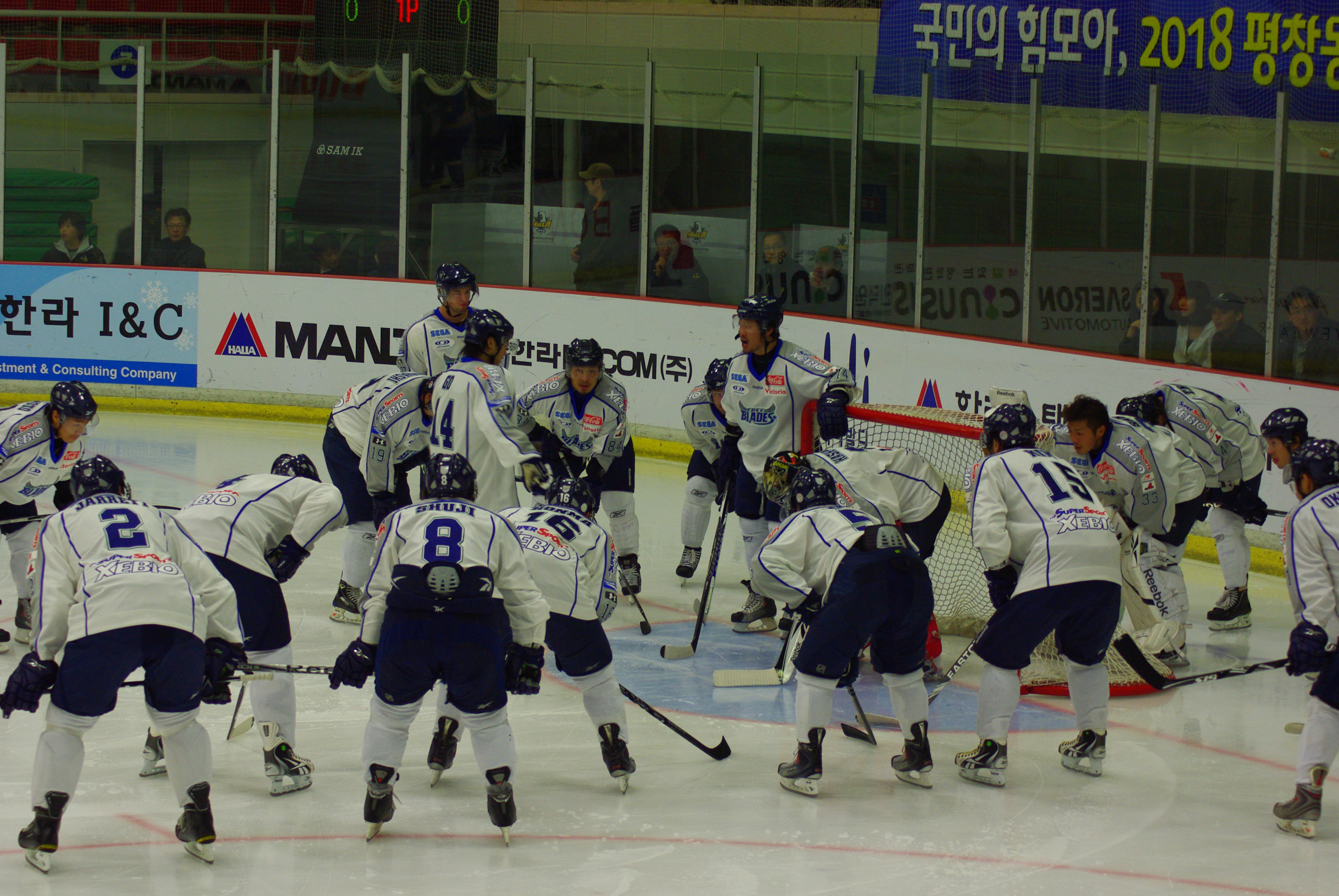
The Tohoku Free Blades in a pre-game circle wearing their away uniforms

updated 1 November 2010

Goaltenders
#	Country	Player	Catches	Acquired	Place of Birth
31	(Japan)	Michio Hashimoto	L	2009	Hachinohe, Japan
50	(Japan)	Shigehito Kimoto	L	2011	Obihiro, Japan
55	(Japan)	Hata Michukazu	L	2012	Kushiro, Japan

Defencemen
#	Country	Player	Shoots	Acquired	Place of Birth
2	(Japan)	Yugo Hagiwara	L	2011	Matsudo, Chiba
3	(Japan)	Yuuya Ariyoshi	L	2010	Sapporo, Japan
4	(Canada)	Darrell Hay	R	2013	Kamloops, Canada
8	(China)	Hu Tianyu	R	2012	China
27	(Japan)	Tomohito Ohkubo	L	2012	Tomakomai, Japan
44	(Canada)	Brad Farynuk	R	2012	Enderby, Canada
54	(Japan)	Goshi Kumagai		2013	Japan
58	(Japan)	Yuhei Shinohara	R	2013	Japan
84	(Japan)	Kyouhei Kikuchi – A	R	2010	Japan

Forwards
#	Country	Player	Position	Shoots	Acquired	Place of Birth
9	(Japan)	Michitaka Motono	F	L	2013	Japan
10	(Japan)	Katsumasa Kondo	F	L	2013	Japan
11	(Japan)	Masahito Suzuki	RW	R	2009	Tomakomai, Japan
14	(Japan)	Go Tanaka - C	C	L	2010	Sapporo, Hokkaidō
18	(Japan)	Naoto Mizuuchi	F	R	2012	Tomakomai, Hokkaidō,
19	(Japan)	Takahashi Kosuke	F		2012	Hokkaido, Japan
21	(Japan)	Kazuki Yamamoto	RW	L	2009	Hokkaidō, Japan
22	(Japan)	Ryō Tanaka	RW	R	2009	Sapporo, Hokkaidō
23	(Japan)	Yoshikazu Kashino	LW/RW	R	2009	Tomakomai, Hokkaidō
25	(Japan)	Kawamoto Akihito	LW	R	2011	Nagoya, Aichi
28	(Japan)	Takuro Yamashita	LW	R	2011	Kushiro, Hokkaidō
40	(Japan)	Takuma Kawai	LW	L	2009	Eniwa, Japan
43	(Montenegro)	Ned Lukacevic	LW	L	2013	Podgorica, Montenegro
47	(Japan)	Kota Shinohara	C	R	2012	Kushiro, Japan

== Leaders ==
=== Team captains ===
- Yasuhiro Ouchi 2009–2010
- Go Tanaka 2010–Present

=== Head coaches ===
- Chris Wakabayashi 2009–2014
- JP MacCallum 2014–15
- Chris Wakabayashi 2015–Present

== Honors ==
- Asia League
  - Winners (3):
- 2010-11 (shared with Anyang Halla)
- 2012–13
- 2014–15
- All Japan Championship:
  - Winners (1):
- 2018

== Past import players ==
- (Canada) Jon Smyth 2009–10, FW
- (Canada) Steve Munn 2009–10, D
- (Canada) Scott Champagne 2010–11, FW
- (Canada) Bruce Mulherin 2009–11, FW
- (Canada) Cole Jarrett 2010–11, D
- (Canada) Brad Farynuk 2009–11, D
- (Canada) Aaron MacKenzie 2011–12, D
- (Canada) Paul Albers 2011–12, D
- (United States) Troy Riddle 2011–12, C
- (Canada) David Wrigley 2012–13, FW
- (United States) Justin Fletcher 2012–13, D
