= JP MacCallum =

Canadian ice hockey coach (born 1975)

JP MacCallum (born March 3, 1975, in Halifax, Nova Scotia) is a Canadian ice hockey coach and former performance trainer. He is the head coach of the March & Mill Co. Hunters of the Nova Scotia U18 Major Hockey League. He was previously head coach of Dunaújváros AC, the Hungarian U-20 team, the Tohoku Free Blades of Japan, and the Herlev Eagles of Denmarks' Metal Ligaen.

== Career ==
MacCallum played varsity ice hockey at Union College in Schenectady, New York, and at Saint Mary's University in Halifax, Nova Scotia. Studying biology (major) and English (minor), he developed an expertise in training and particularly in strength training for hockey players. He became a full-time trainer with his own performance training business in 2000 and worked with athletes off-season, including Alex Grant, Brad Marchand and Andrew Bodnarchuk. In 2004, he was named assistant coach at Saint Mary’s and stayed until 2007.

MacCallum accepted an offer from Dunaújváros AC, a professional club from Hungary, to become their assistant coach. After serving in that position during the 2008-09 season, he was promoted to head coach in 2009 and remained until 2011. While in Hungary, he also worked for the Hungarian ice hockey federation, serving as head coach of the country’s under-20 national team and as assistant coach of the men’s national team, which included an appearances at the 2012 World Hockey Championships (Division 1, Group A) in Slovenia.

In 2012, MacCallum was signed by the Tohoku Free Blades of Japan. He served as an assistant coach for two years and then took over head coaching duties in 2014. In his single season at the helm, he guided the Free Blades to the Asia League Championship title.

In March 2016, he was named head coach of the Herlev Eagles of Denmark’s top-flight Metal Ligaen.

In October 2025, while head coach of the March & Mill Co. Hunters of the Nova Scotia U18 Major Hockey League, his 10-year-old daughter died of cancer. The Hunters' 2025-26 season had been dedicated to her and wore special jerseys in her honor at their home opener. After her death, Marchand and Bodnarchuk stepped in to guest coach a tribute game dedicated to her in the Halifax Forum; a bursary was also established to be awarded in her name to the local hockey community.
