= Brad Marchand =

Canadian ice hockey player (born 1988)

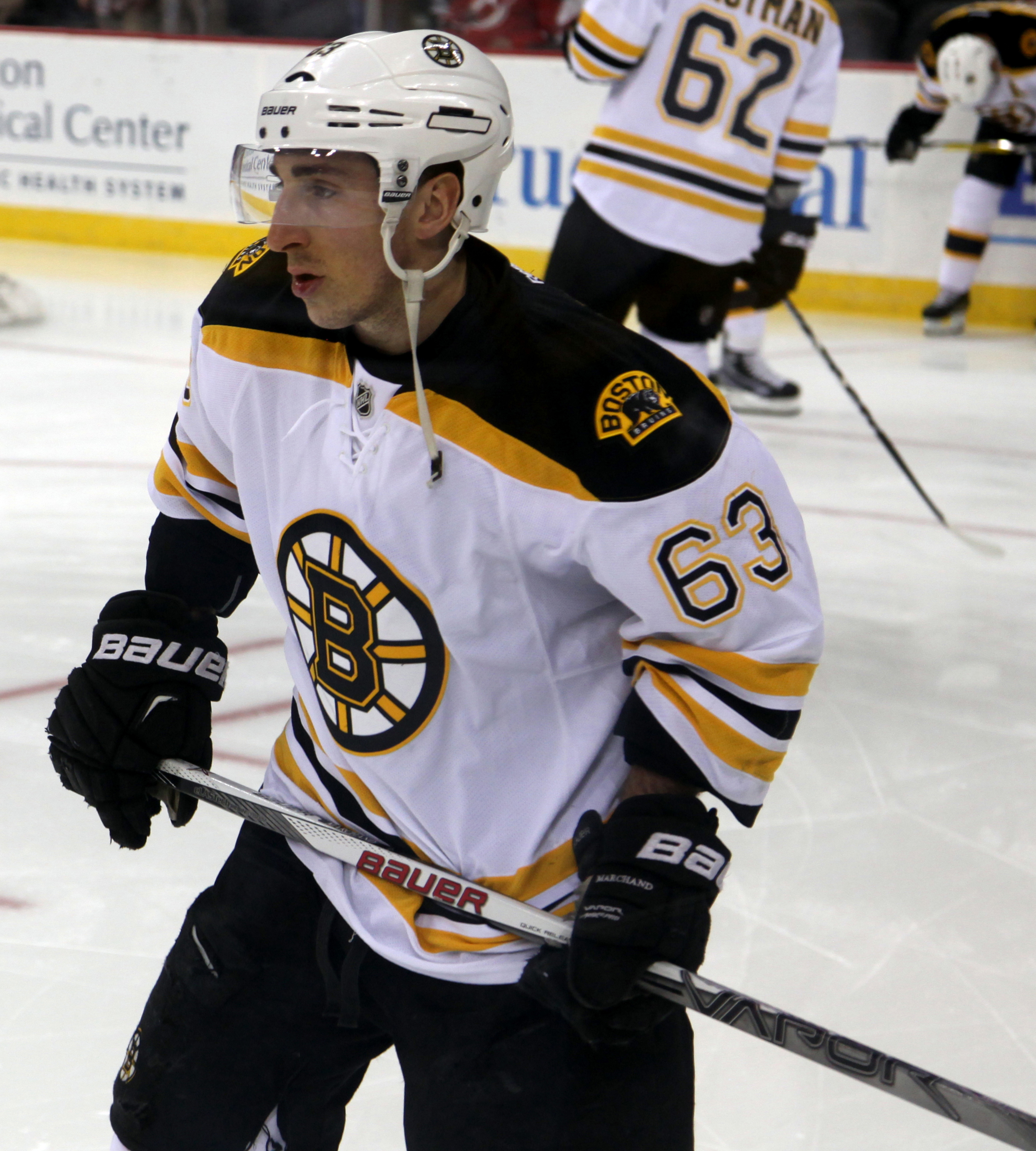
- Marchand with the Boston Bruins in March 2016
- Born: May 11, 1988 (age 38) Halifax, Nova Scotia, Canada
- Height: 5 ft 9 in (175 cm)
- Weight: 180 lb (82 kg; 12 st 12 lb)
- Position: Left wing
- Shoots: Left
- NHL team Former teams: Florida Panthers; Boston Bruins
- National team: Canada
- NHL draft: 71st overall, 2006; Boston Bruins
- Playing career: 2008–present
- Website: bradmarchand.com

Bradley Kevin Marchand (/ˈmɑːrʃɔːnd/ MAR-shawnd; born May 11, 1988) is a Canadian professional ice hockey player who is a left winger for the Florida Panthers of the National Hockey League (NHL). The Boston Bruins selected Marchand in the third round, 71st overall, of the 2006 NHL entry draft.

Marchand was raised in Hammonds Plains, Nova Scotia, the oldest of four children born to two local hockey coaches. Between 2004 and 2008, Marchand played for three junior ice hockey teams – he was drafted by the Moncton Wildcats, was traded to the Val-d'Or Foreurs in 2006, and was traded again to the Halifax Mooseheads in 2007. At the same time, the Bruins were scouting Marchand, and made a trade with the New York Islanders to ensure that he was drafted by Boston in 2006.

After Halifax fell to the Gatineau Olympiques in the 2009 QMJHL championships, with Marchand a healthy scratch for their elimination game, the Bruins told Marchand to stay home and report that fall for training camp. He spent the 2008–09 season with the Providence Bruins before making his NHL debut in October 2009. Marchand was a member of the Bruins' starting roster in 2010, playing on the fourth line but moving up to the first line once the playoffs began, helping the Bruins win the Stanley Cup in 2011. Marchand also helped the Bruins clinch appearances in the Stanley Cup Final in 2013 and 2019. During his tenure with the Bruins, Marchand increased both his number of goals per season and his reputation as a pest, receiving numerous fines and suspensions, and being named to four NHL All-Star Teams. Between 2018 and 2021, Marchand was one of the top-scoring left wings in the NHL, with his 163 assists and 256 points the most of any skater in the position during the 2018–19, 2019–20 and 2020–21 seasons combined. In 2021–22 season, he was suspended a total of nine games in that season alone, and became the most suspended player in NHL history, in terms of individual suspensions. After a trade to the Florida Panthers, the defending Stanley Cup champions, in March 2025, Marchand would play a key role in the Panthers' postseason run and won his second Stanley Cup in 2025.

Marchand has represented Canada at the 2016 World Cup of Hockey and the 4 Nations Face-Off in 2025, winning both.

== Early life ==
Marchand was born on May 11, 1988, in Halifax, and raised in Hammonds Plains. Marchand was the oldest of four children born to Kevin and Lynn Marchand, with all of his siblings born in a four-year span. His father was known as a goon during his junior ice hockey years, at one time engaging in 40 fights within a 40-game span. After collecting 358 penalty minutes in one season, Kevin Marchand's coach taught him how to balance the physical aspect of the game with skill and scoring, a lesson which he in turn taught his children as they began their hockey careers. Marchand began playing hockey at the age of two in Lower Sackville, Nova Scotia, and developed an aggressive playing style from a young age. He remembers beginning to fight in games around the age of 13 as an outlet for his excessive energy. The following year, he hit an opponent with enough force to damage the cage on the player's helmet. Marchand struggled with his temper throughout his childhood, and took anger management classes as an adolescent. As his hockey career progressed, he would also begin seeing a sport psychologist to address his on-ice frustrations.

Growing up, Marchand became close friends with future National Hockey League (NHL) player and teammate on the Boston Bruins minor league team, the Providence Bruins, Andrew Bodnarchuk, a fellow Hammonds Plains native and his minor ice hockey teammate for the Dartmouth Subways of the Tantallon Amateur Sports Association. Marchand also played for his school team at Madeline Symonds Middle School alongside Bodnarchuk. Marchand gained a reputation both for taking penalties and for riling his opponents during his minor hockey career, and he formed intense rivalries both with his Cole Harbour rivals and with his larger, stronger teammates.

== Playing career ==
=== Amateur ===
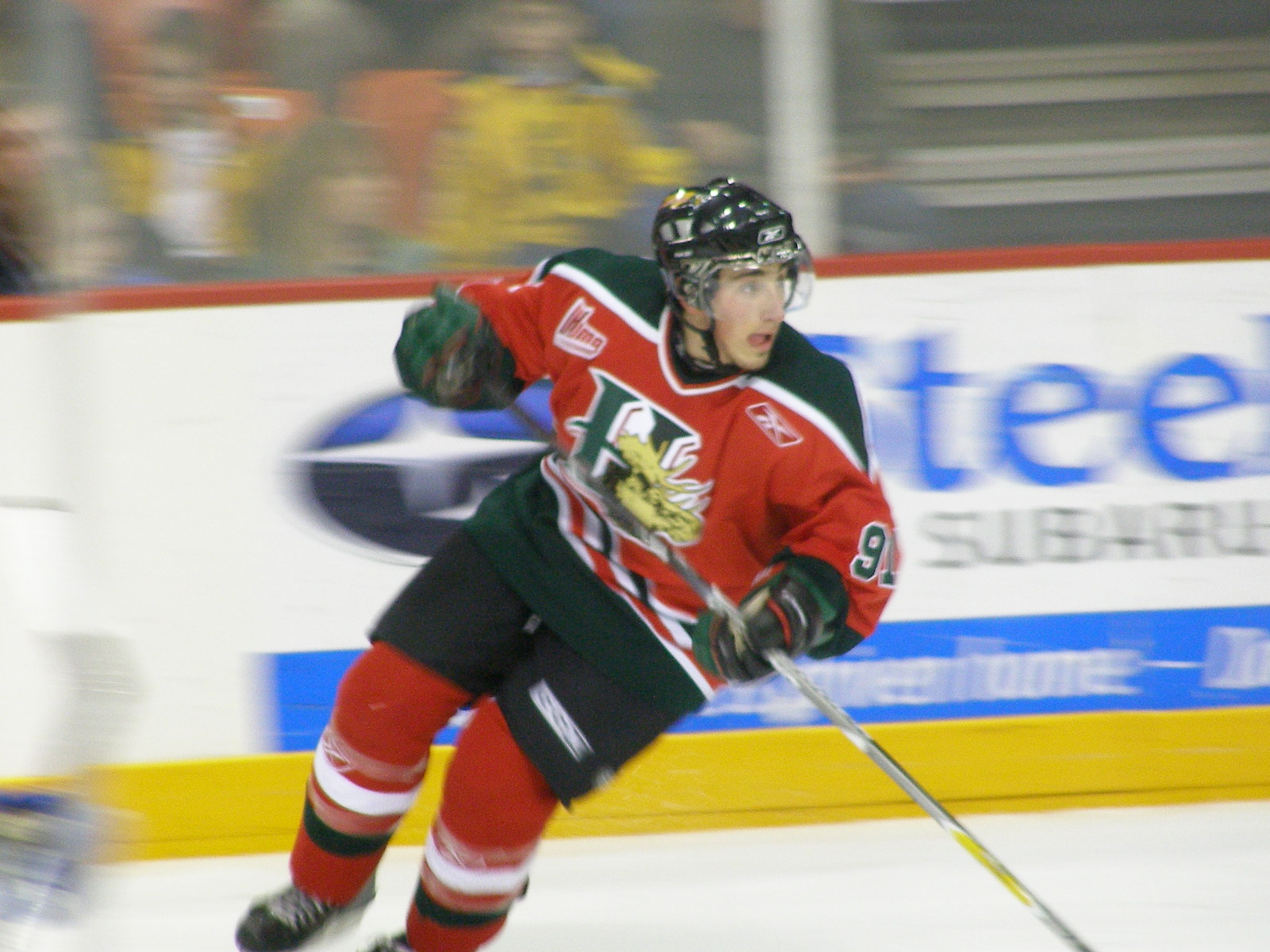
Marchand playing for the Halifax Mooseheads in January 2008

The Moncton Wildcats of the Quebec Major Junior Hockey League (QMJHL) selected Marchand 24th overall in the 2004 QMJHL entry draft. He scored 29 goals for Moncton in his draft year, and was awarded the team's Rookie of the Year. Shortly before the 2005–06 season, Moncton hired Ted Nolan as their new head coach, and he took to Marchand's "drive and determination" at once, giving the skater an extensive role on the team. Under this new direction, Marchand scored 29 goals and 66 points in 68 regular season games for Moncton, and led the team to a President's Cup championship and the Memorial Cup finals with another five goals and 14 assists in 20 playoff games. The Wildcats ultimately lost in the finals to the Quebec Remparts. The Boston Bruins of the NHL spent the season scouting Marchand, and traded two fourth-round picks in the 2006 NHL entry draft to the New York Islanders in exchange for a third-round pick, which they used to select Marchand 71st overall. Marchand signed an entry-level contract with the team in October 2007.

On January 2, 2006, the Wildcats traded Marchand and two draft picks to the Val-d'Or Foreurs in exchange for Luc Bourdon, Jean-Sebastien Adam, and Ian Mathieu-Girard, with Marchand's part of the trade going into effect just before the 2006–07 season. He scored 33 goals and 47 assists in 57 regular season games with Val-d'Or, and in that season's playoffs, he led the league with 16 goals and 24 assists in 20 games. At the same time, he showed signs of being a grinder, putting up 36 penalty minutes. Although the Lewiston Maineiacs swept the Foreurs in the Memorial Cup finals, Maineiacs skater David Perron and goaltender Jonathan Bernier saw a threat in Marchand, both for his offensive ability and the way in which he frustrated his opponents. He returned to the Foreurs the following season, putting up 21 goals and 23 assists in 33 games.

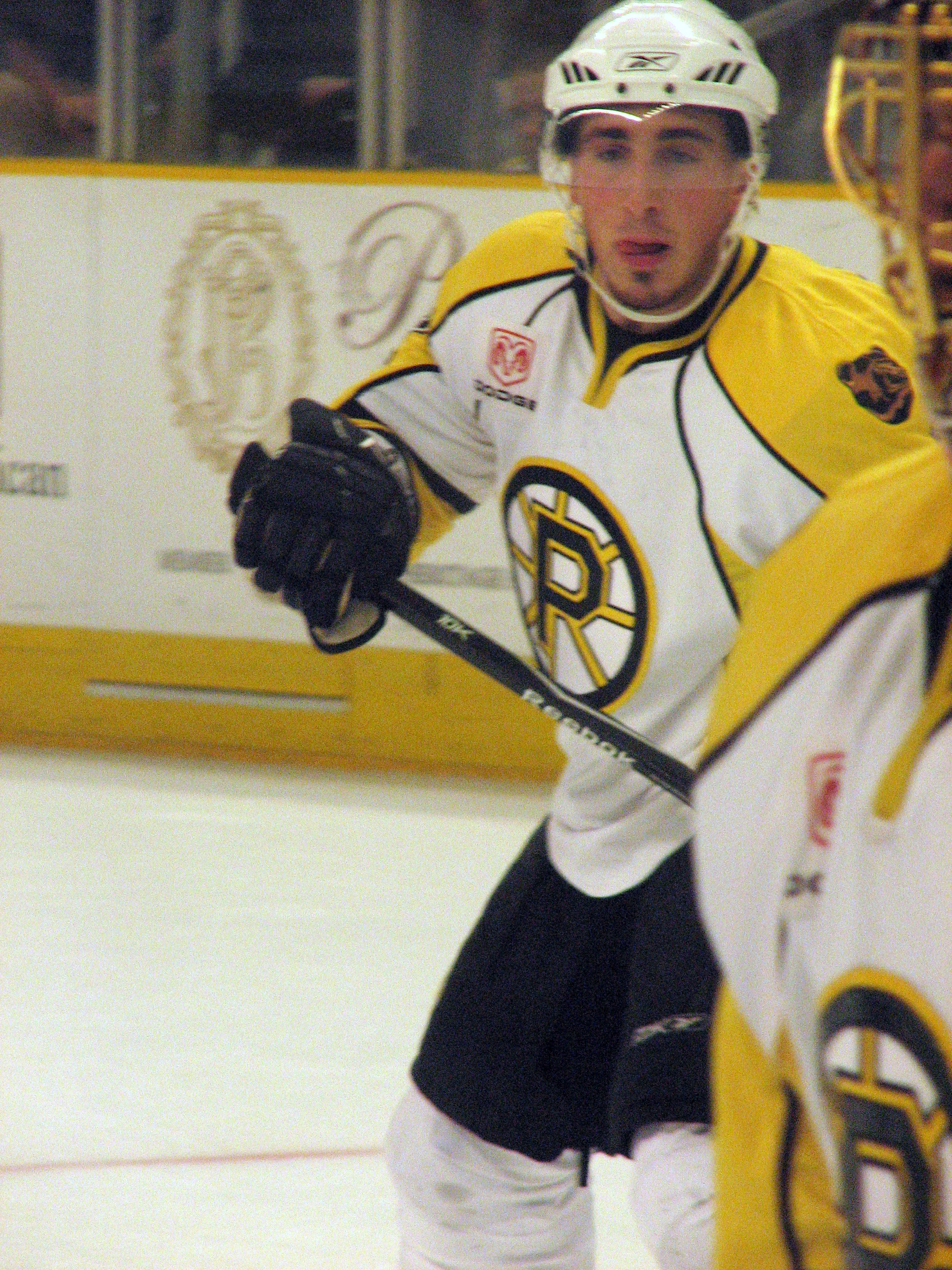
Marchand with the Providence Bruins in November 2008

On December 17, 2007, the first day of the QMJHL trading window, the Foreurs traded Marchand to the Halifax Mooseheads in exchange for forward Maxime Sauvé and five future draft picks, including two in the first round. Earlier that day, Halifax had acquired Sauvé from the Quebec Remparts in exchange for centre David Gilbert. When the Foreurs had first approached Marchand about potential trades, he had been eager to join his hometown team, where his childhood friends Hillier and Bodnarchuk were already playing. He played in 26 regular season games for Halifax, putting up 29 points in the process, before leading the team with 18 postseason points in 14 games. After the Mooseheads lost three straight semifinal games to the Gatineau Olympiques, however, Halifax head coach Cam Russell made Marchand a healthy scratch for game four, which Halifax ultimately lost as well.

=== Professional ===
==== AHL season (2008–2009) ====
After the Mooseheads' loss in the QMJHL playoffs, the Bruins told Marchand that, rather than joining the team for the remainder of their season, he would be invited to summer training camp. Marchand was frustrated with the decision, which was rumoured to be due to his on-ice attitude, and he entered the Bruins' 2008 training camp looking to rebuild his reputation and establish himself as a strong player. He played the 2008–09 season with the Providence Bruins, Boston's American Hockey League (AHL) affiliate, where he finished second in scoring among all AHL rookies with 18 goals and 41 assists in 79 games. That scoring continued into the playoffs, where Marchand added another seven goals and eight assists in 16 games. The Providence Bruins advanced to the final four of the 2009 Calder Cup playoffs, where they were eliminated by the eventual Calder Cup-winning Hershey Bears.

==== Boston Bruins (2009–2025) ====
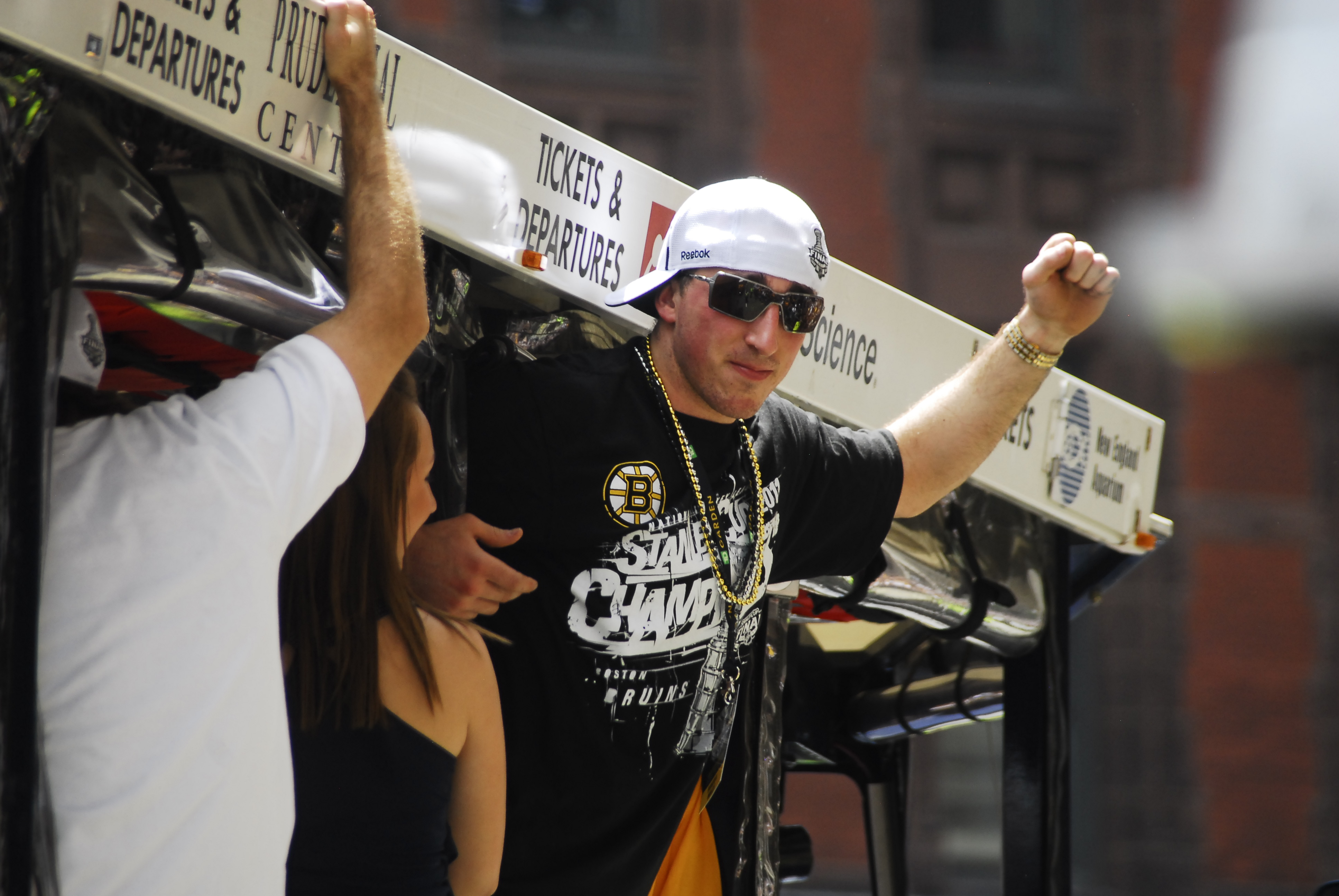
Marchand in June 2011 at the 2011 Stanley Cup victory parade in Downtown Boston

Marchand opened the 2009–10 season with Providence, but received his first NHL call-up after scoring six points in his first six games. He made his NHL debut on October 21, 2009, picking up an assist on Michael Ryder's goal in a 3–2 win against the Nashville Predators. After 11 scoreless games, Boston sent Marchand back down to Providence, where he scored only seven goals in a 28-game stretch. Later in the season, Marchand saw a hot streak of 16 points in 14 AHL games, leading to his second call-up. He skated in 20 NHL games that year, putting up only one assist and 20 penalty minutes.

Originally, Marchand was meant to serve as the Bruins' spare fourth-line forward for the 2010–11 season, with Daniel Paille starting alongside Gregory Campbell and Shawn Thornton. However, a strong training camp performance from Marchand pushed Paille from the starting lineup to the bench, with the latter filling in during brief periods of injury. Marchand scored his first NHL goal on November 3, 2010, against the Buffalo Sabres. By the end of the season, Marchand had 41 points (21 goals, 20 assists) in 77 contests, far fewer than fellow rookies Jeff Skinner, Logan Couture, and Michael Grabner, but he averaged significantly less time on the ice, and when he was asked to play, he was given few opportunities to score. Marchand also earned the first suspension of his NHL career during the season, receiving a two-game penalty on March 17, 2011, for elbowing R. J. Umberger of the Columbus Blue Jackets. That year, Marchand was the recipient of the Bruin's Seventh Player Award, given by fans of the New England Sports Network to the player who surpassed expectations. By the 2011 playoffs, Marchand got bumped up from the fourth line with Thornton and Campbell to the first line with Patrice Bergeron and Mark Recchi. On April 14, Marchand made his Stanley Cup playoff debut in the first game of the opening round against the Montreal Canadiens, where the Bruins would be defeated 2–0 to give the Bruins a 1–0 deficit to start the series. In game two of the matchup two days later, Marchand recorded his first career playoff assist on a Patrice Bergeron goal although the Canadiens would defeat the Bruins in the game 3–1 to give the Bruins a 2–0 series deficit. After helping the Bruins win the next two games, Marchand recorded his first career playoff goal in game five of the series on Canadiens' goaltender Carey Price as the Bruins won the game 2–1 for a 3–2 series lead. The third-seeded Bruins would go on to defeat the Canadiens in seven games before sweeping the second-seeded Philadelphia Flyers and defeating the fifth-seeded Tampa Bay Lightning in seven games en route to help the Bruins clinch their first appearance in the Stanley Cup Final since 1990. After losing the first two games of the Finals against the Presidents' Trophy-winning Vancouver Canucks and going pointless in both, Marchand recorded a goal on Canucks' goaltender Roberto Luongo and an assist on a Mark Recchi goal in game three on June 6 in which the Bruins exploded to an 8–1 victory. Marchand went on to score another goal in a lopsided 4–0 win over the Canucks in game four on June 8 to even the series 2–2. After getting shutout in a 1–0 loss in game five on June 10 for a 3–2 deficit, Marchand scored the first goal of the game in game six on June 13 as the Bruins would go on to win the game 5–2 to and forcing a seventh game and prevent the Canucks from clinching the Stanley Cup. In the sixth game, Marchand was criticized by sportswriters for repeatedly punching Canucks star forward Daniel Sedin, an altercation for which he received no penalty. After the fact, reporters asked why Marchand continued to hit Sedin unprovoked, to which he responded, "Because I felt like it." Marchand scored two goals one of which an empty net goal and an assist on a Patrice Bergeron goal in game seven of the Final on June 15, helping to clinch the championship for Boston against the Canucks as the Bruins won the game 4–0 for a 4–3 series victory, erasing a 3–2 series deficit in doing so. He finished the playoffs by scoring 19 points (11 goals, eight assists) in all 25 postseason games. Marchand's 11 playoff goals during the Bruins' 2011 championship run tied Jeremy Roenick for the second-most of any NHL rookie.

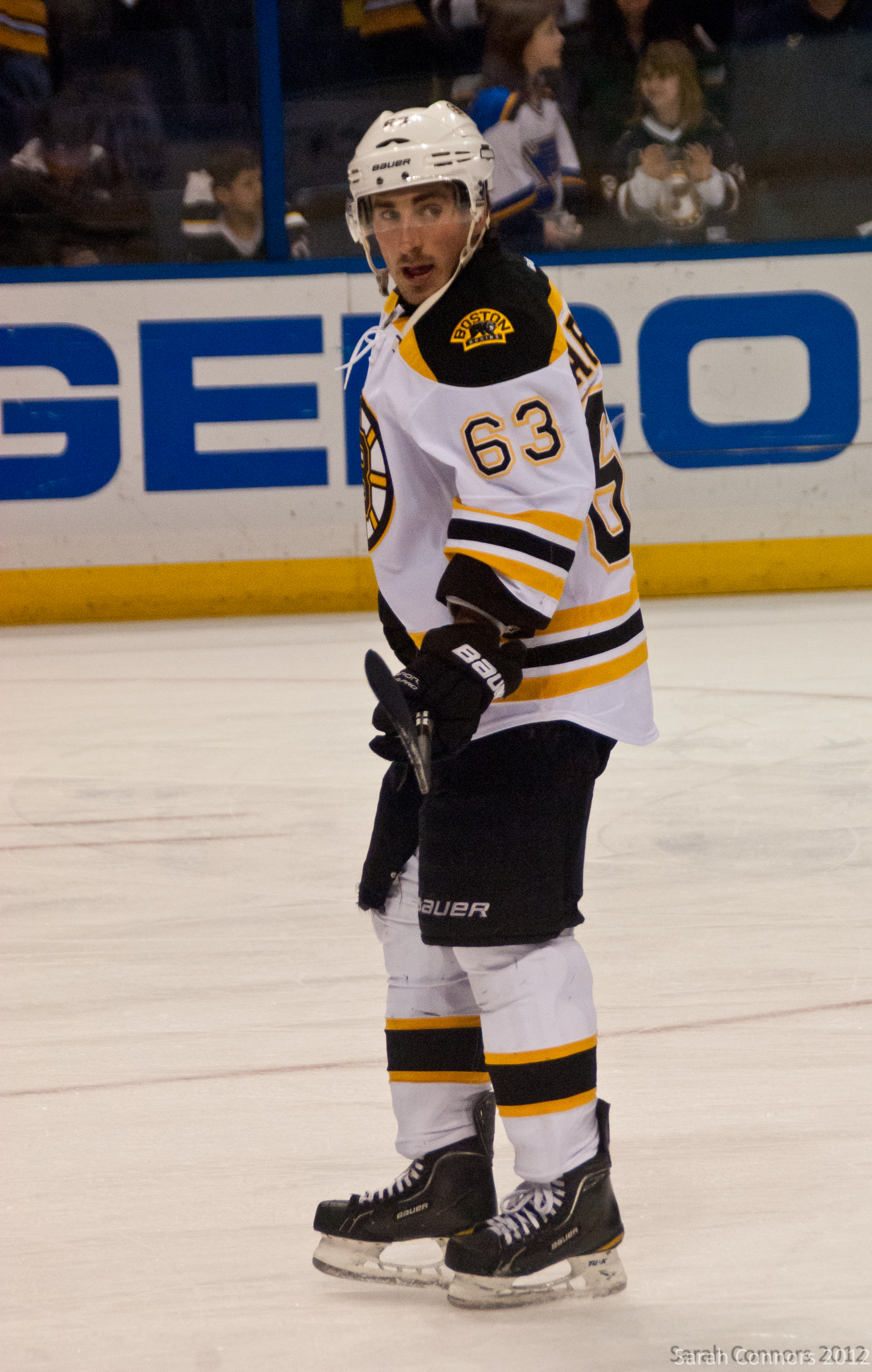
Marchand with the Boston Bruins in February 2012

On September 14, 2011, the Bruins announced that they had re-signed Marchand to a two-year contract, without disclosing the financial terms of the deal. Shortly after, Marchand scored the Bruins' first goal of the 2011–12 season in the season opener on October 6, a backhand pass against the Philadelphia Flyers. As the season progressed, Marchand also continued to develop his reputation as a pest. That October, Marchand tried to fight with defenceman P. K. Subban of the Montreal Canadiens twice within the same game, only to be broken up by officials both times. On December 12, the NHL fined Marchand $2,500 for slew footing Matt Niskanen of the Pittsburgh Penguins the week prior, a penalty which resulted in an on-ice fight between Marchand and Niskanen. Later that season, Marchand scored his first NHL hat trick, scoring three goals and a career-high five points in the Bruins' defeat of the Florida Panthers on December 23. On January 9, 2012, Marchand was suspended for five games and fined over $150,000 for clipping Vancouver Canucks defenceman Sami Salo, resulting in a concussion for Salo. Marchand and Julien defended the hit, arguing that it was performed in self-defence against Salo, who stood 6 inches (150 mm) taller than Marchand. After finishing his breakout season having scored 28 goals and 27 assists for 55 points in 76 contests and playing on a line with Patrice Bergeron and Tyler Seguin, Marchand was moved to the Bruins' "Merlot" line with Gregory Campbell and Shawn Thornton for the 2012 playoffs. After battling their way to a game seven overtime, the defending Stanley Cup champion Bruins fell to the seventh-seeded Washington Capitals in the Eastern Conference quarterfinal. At the end of the year, Marchand took home both the Elizabeth C. Dufresne Trophy, awarded for outstanding performance during home games, and the John P. Bucyk Award for charitable contributions off the ice.

On September 7, 2012, the Bruins extended Marchand's contract by four more years, with his salary carrying an average annual value of $4.5 million. When the 2012–13 season was indefinitely delayed due to a lockout, many of Marchand's teammates struck deals to play in European hockey leagues, an option that Marchand met with trepidation. He ultimately chose to wait out the lock-out, and did not play professional hockey until the season began in January 2013. Paired with Bergeron and Seguin, both of whom spent the lock-out in the Swiss National League, Marchand worried that he would be out of practice compared to his teammates. He ultimately scored 18 goals and 18 assists for 36 points in 45 games of the 48-game lockout-shortened season, producing at a pace that would have seen him score 31 goals and record 62 points in an 82-game season. As the Bruins defeated the fifth-seeded Toronto Maple Leafs in seven games in the first round of the 2013 playoffs, Marchand scored his first postseason overtime goal in game one of the second round series against Henrik Lundqvist of the sixth-seeded New York Rangers. After defeating the Rangers in five games in the second round and sweeping the top-seeded Pittsburgh Penguins in the third round to clinch their spot in the 2013 Stanley Cup Final, the Presidents' Trophy-winning Chicago Blackhawks overpowered the Bruins in the Final, defeating them in six games.

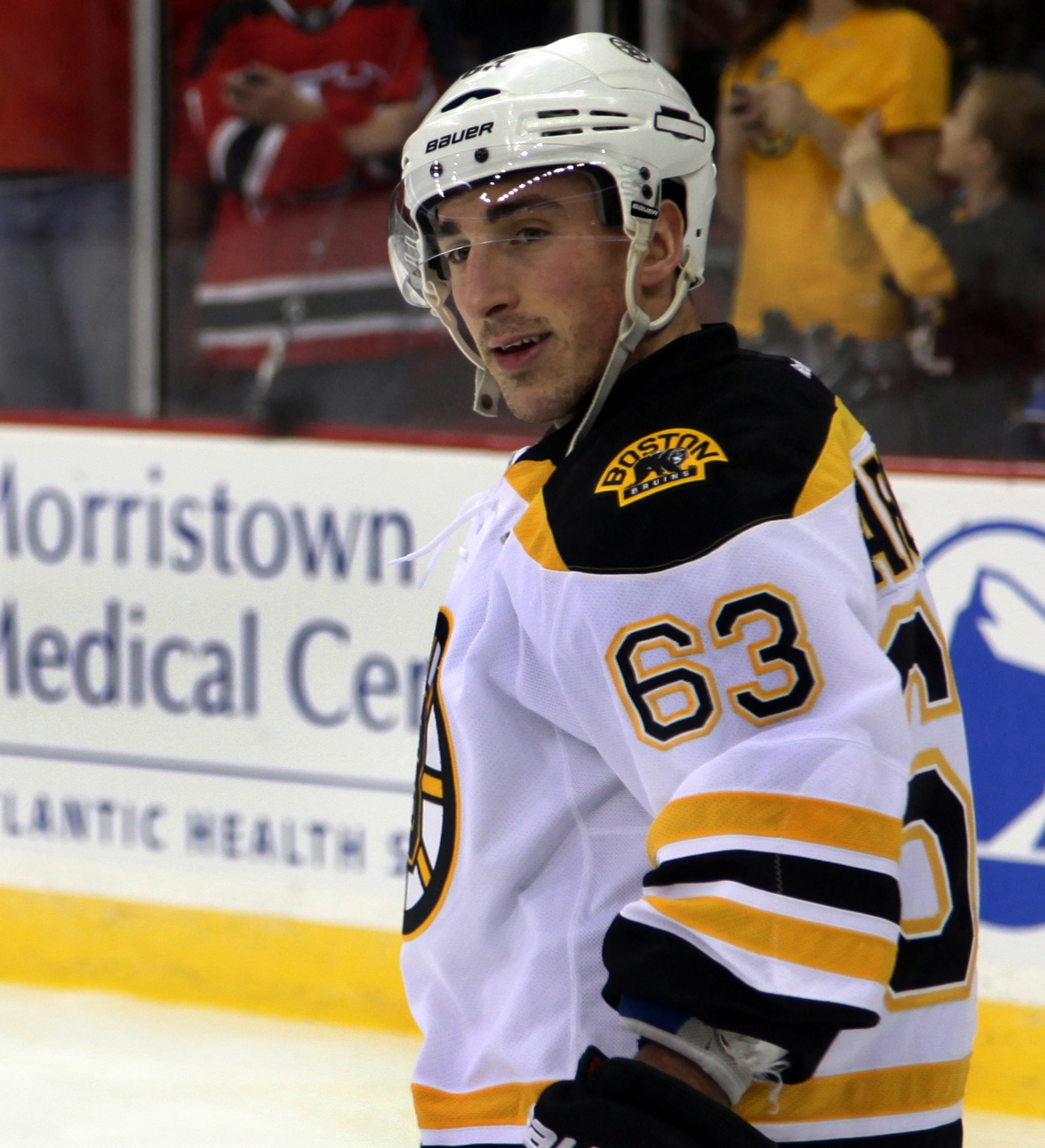
Marchand with the Bruins in October 2013

Going into the 2013–14 season with Tyler Seguin and Jaromír Jágr no longer on the Bruins, Marchand struggled to adjust to his new linemate Loui Eriksson, colliding with the other winger during a preseason game against the Winnipeg Jets on September 27, 2013. Marchand's struggles continued into the season, with just three goals in the first 20 games. Bruins head coach Claude Julien demoted Marchand from the second to the third and fourth lines on several occasions, giving players like Jordan Caron an opportunity to fill his position in the top-six. His decision to taunt the Vancouver Canucks by kissing his 2011 Stanley Cup championship ring in a December 14 game at Rogers Arena, (the first time the Bruins returned to the arena since game seven of the 2011 Stanley Cup Final on June 15, 2011) that the Bruins lost 6–2 frustrated Julien, who wanted to improve Marchand's scoring while tempering his emotions. By the end of the season, Marchand had improved to 25 goals and set a career high of 28 assists for 53 points in all 82 games played to help the Bruins win the Presidents' Trophy as the regular season champions, but he voiced disappointment in his own individual performance, citing a struggle with the mental aspects of hockey. His scoring struggles continued into the 2014 playoffs, when the Bruins defeated the eighth-seeded Detroit Red Wings in five games before getting defeated in six games by the sixth-seeded Montreal Canadiens in the second round and Marchand scored only five assists in all 12 games and missed an empty net goal in game four in the first round from only 3 feet (0.91 m) away. Despite dissatisfaction with his own performance, the Bruins awarded Marchand the 2014 Eddie Shore Award, given to the player who demonstrates "exceptional hustle and determination" throughout the season.

Marchand entered the 2014–15 season having worked on his off-season conditioning and the mental aspects of the game in the hopes that it would break his slump from the previous season. On November 15, 2014, Marchand recorded his 100th career NHL assist in a 2–1 victory over the Carolina Hurricanes on a goal by Patrice Bergeron. On December 6, Marchand scored his 100th NHL goal in a 5–2 win over the Arizona Coyotes on Coyotes' goaltender Devan Dubnyk. Although the season was considered a disappointment as a team, having finished the season with only 96 points in the standings, just two points behind the Pittsburgh Penguins for the eighth and last playoff spot to miss the playoffs as a result for the first time since 2007, Marchand was a bright spot, leading Boston with 24 total goals and five game-winning goals while also recording 18 assists for 42 points in 77 contests. After the season, Marchand admitted in an interview that the Bruins had been "a little bit divided", and that there were "different cliques" on the team, which in turn impacted their on-ice performance. He also revealed that he had been battling an elbow injury ever since the 2014 playoffs, and he underwent surgery during the 2015 off-season to repair torn tendons in the area. After the season, 98.5 The Sports Hub named Marchand the Bruins' Third Star of the year, with Bergeron and Tuukka Rask receiving the first and second stars, respectively.

The Bruins' offence continued to struggle into the 2015–16 season, when Marchand was indefinitely placed on the injured list. He had been stunned by a collision with Dale Weise of the Montreal Canadiens on October 10, 2015, and did not return to the game; the Bruins later revealed that Marchand had suffered a concussion from the collision. He ultimately missed two games, returning on October 17 for a match against the Arizona Coyotes. Marchand was on the other side of a suspension on November 12, when he suffered an illegal check to the head from Colorado Avalanche skater and captain Gabriel Landeskog. Landeskog received a two-game suspension, while Marchand was fined $5,000 for throwing a punch after the incident. On December 30, Marchand received a suspension of his own for clipping Mark Borowiecki of the Ottawa Senators. Because Marchand was considered a repeat offender, he was penalized with three games and over $150,000. During a home game on February 6, 2016, Marchand was allowed an overtime penalty shot against the Buffalo Sabres when defenceman Rasmus Ristolainen dropped his stick to grab Marchand and prevent a shot. Marchand successfully made the shot for the first overtime penalty-shot goal in franchise history. While the Bruins missed the playoffs once again by just three points in the standings with a regular season tiebreaker loss to the Ottawa Senators, Marchand set a career-high 37 goals during the 2015–16 season along with 24 assists for 61 points in 77 games. He also received his second Seventh Player Award, as voted by fans of the New England Sports Network.

On September 26, 2016, the Bruins signed Marchand to an eight-year, $49 million contract extension that would carry through to the 2024–25 season. The contract carried an annual average value of $6.125 million. Marchand opened the 2016–17 season with a scoring rush, putting up two goals and three assists for five points in the first game of the season against the Columbus Blue Jackets, followed by four points in the next three games against the Toronto Maple Leafs, Winnipeg Jets and New Jersey Devils, respectively. After leading the Bruins in scoring for the first half of the season, putting up 13 goals and 22 assists for 35 points in 43 games, Marchand received his first selection to the NHL All-Star Game in January 2017. He nearly missed the game after meeting with the Department of Player Safety for a "dangerous trip" of Niklas Kronwall of the Detroit Red Wings, but ultimately received a $10,000 fine and no suspension. On March 14, Marchand recorded an assist on a goal by David Backes and scored the second hat trick of his NHL career and sixth career four point game, with all three goals coming in the third period of a 6–3 win over the Vancouver Canucks. After putting up 39 goals and 46 assists for 85 points in 80 games during the season, Marchand missed the final two games of the season due a suspension for spearing Jake Dotchin of the Tampa Bay Lightning. The Bruins' 4–0 victory in that game helped them clinch a berth in the playoffs for the first time since 2014. The Bruins fell to the Ottawa Senators in the first round of the 2017 playoffs in six games, with Marchand scoring only one goal and three assists for four points in the six-game series. At the end of the year, Marchand received his first NHL first All-Star team selection, while the Bruins awarded him both the Elizabeth C. Dufresne Trophy and the team's Third Star.

After having a career year in 2016–17, Marchand intended to double down on his consistent offensive production for the 2017–18 season with linemates Patrice Bergeron and David Pastrňák as they started being referred as the "Perfection" line. His athletic abilities that season, however, were largely overshadowed by his on-ice behaviour. On January 24, 2018, Marchand received a five-game suspension from the NHL for an elbow to the head of New Jersey Devils forward Marcus Johansson the previous day, who suffered a concussion from the play. It was the ninth time that Marchand had received either a fine or suspension from the Department of Player Safety. Despite the 2018 All-Star Game taking place in the midst of Marchand's suspension, he was allowed to take part in the game and skills competition at Amalie Arena, where he was subject to booing from fans in attendance. On March 9, after receiving a previous warning about embellishing his reaction to a hit in an attempt to draw penalties, Marchand was fined $2,000 for embellishing a tripping penalty by Olli Määttä of the Pittsburgh Penguins. The following day, Marchand collided with Blackhawks skater Anthony Duclair, causing the latter a season-ending leg injury. Duclair told reporters that Marchand had reached out to him after the injury, but that it was still a "pretty dirty" play. On April 2, Marchand received his second fine in the span of a month, with a $5,000 penalty for cross-checking Andrew MacDonald of the Philadelphia Flyers. That same season, Marchand scored the third hat trick of his career with an overtime shot against the Red Wings. The last goal was also his 11th regular season overtime goal, passing Glen Murray's record for the most among the Bruins since overtime was reinstated during the 1983–84 season. Marchand took home the Elizabeth C. Dufresne Trophy for the second year in a row, and was moved from the Bruins' Third Star to Second at the end-of-year awards ceremony. Marchand's on-ice behaviour came to a head during the 2018 playoffs, when the NHL placed him on notice for kissing and licking his opponents, behaviour that the league deemed "unacceptable" while warning that "similar behavior in the future will be dealt with by way of supplemental discipline". Marchand's habit was first noticed during a November 2017 game against the Toronto Maple Leafs, when he leaned in to kiss Leo Komarov on the cheek rather than fighting him. During game one of the first-round playoff series between Toronto and Boston, Marchand licked Komarov on the face, joking to reporters, "I just wanted to get close to him." He and the NHL both denied that licking Komarov had led to any warning or disciplinary action from the league. Instead, the warning came during the second round, when he licked Tampa Bay Lightning forward Ryan Callahan across the face. After receiving the warning, Marchand told reporters that he was going to "really take a pretty hard look in the mirror" and improve "some character things". After the Bruins were eliminated from the playoffs by the top-seeded Lightning having been defeated by them in five games, the team revealed that several skaters had been playing through injuries including Marchand after he suffered a groin injury that affected him for the final six to seven games of the playoffs. Despite his injury and controversies, Marchand scored 85 points (34 goals, 51 assists) in 68 regular season games and added another 17 points (four goals, 13 assists) in all 12 playoff appearances.

In the opening game of the Bruins' 2018–19 season against the newly-defending Stanley Cup champion Washington Capitals on October 3, 2018, in which the Bruins would lose 7–0, Marchand became frustrated with post-goal celebration by Capitals forward Lars Eller and started fighting Eller hard enough to bloody him. Marchand was ejected from the game with fighting and instigator penalties, as well as a 10-minute game misconduct. In his next game the next day, Marchand tied his career high four assists in a game as part of a 4–0 shutout against the Buffalo Sabres as he recorded assists on all four goals by Patrice Bergeron, David Pastrňák, Ryan Donato and captain Zdeno Chára, respectively. He and the Perfection line of him, Bergeron and Pastrňák continued to generate offensive power throughout the season, and on March 31, 2019, Marchand scored the 26th shorthanded goal of his career against Jimmy Howard of the Detroit Red Wings, breaking Rick Middleton's franchise record. In the following game against the Columbus Blue Jackets on April 3, Marchand scored his 100th point of the season with an assist on a goal by David Pastrňák, becoming the tenth player in franchise history to reach the mark and the first Bruin since Joe Thornton during the 2002–03 season. For his performance, Marchand received an NHL second All-Star team selection, as well as his third consecutive Elizabeth C. Dufresne Trophy and the Bruins' First Star. He ended the season with 36 goals and a career high 64 assists and 100 points in 79 games as the Bruins as a team finished as the third seed in the East for a second consecutive season. After the Bruins defeated the Toronto Maple Leafs in seven games in the first round of the 2019 playoffs for the second consecutive year and overcame a 3–2 series deficit, the Bruins and the Columbus Blue Jackets faced each other again in the second round. In game three of the series on April 30, Marchand came under fire for a punch to the back of the head of defenceman Scott Harrington, which ultimately did not result in a suspension. The Bruins would eventually defeat the eighth-seeded Blue Jackets in six games and followed up by defeating the seventh-seeded Carolina Hurricanes in a four-game sweep in the Eastern Conference Final, clinching a spot in the 2019 Stanley Cup Final, Marchand's third appearance in the Stanley Cup Final. Going into the Final, Marchand was considered a heavy favorite for the Conn Smythe Trophy as the playoff MVP if the Bruins were to win the Stanley Cup. However, Marchand could not carry his scoring power from the regular season and the first three rounds of the playoffs into the Final, scoring only two goals and three assists for five points in the series and carrying a −2 rating. The Bruins took the St. Louis Blues to seven games, falling 4–1 in the seventh and final game on home ice on June 12, while Marchand took responsibility for part of his team's game seven loss. At the end of the first period of game seven, with less than 15 seconds remaining before the first intermission, Marchand skated to the bench to signal for a line change, allowing opponents Jaden Schwartz and Alex Pietrangelo of the Blues to skate by him, with the latter scoring a goal against goaltender and teammate Tuukka Rask.

Marchand and the Bruins opened the 2019–20 season with a desire to move past the previous season's game seven in the Stanley Cup Final and to continue the discipline that Marchand had been practicing in recent years. On October 27, 2019, the "Perfection line" of Bergeron – Marchand – Pastrňák combined for a total of 13 points against the New York Rangers. While Bergeron scored his fifth career hat trick, Marchand and Pastrňák put up five points apiece, becoming the first pair of Bruins teammates to do so since Joe Thornton and Glen Murray on December 28, 2001, in a 7–1 Bruins victory over the Florida Panthers. On November 26, Marchand became the 11th Bruins skater to reach 600 career points, with a first period goal against Carey Price of the Montreal Canadiens. Marchand and his linemates kept up their scoring pace throughout the season, and when the NHL suspended operations in March 2020 due to the COVID-19 pandemic. While playing on the top line that season, Marchand became a playmaker, setting up goals for Bergeron and Pastrňák. Although he had only 28 goals in the season, Marchand compiled 59 assists for 87 points, the sixth-highest in the NHL for the year and the highest on the Bruins. 26 of Pastrňák's 48 regular season goals had assists from Marchand, including 18 primary assists. Before the last three weeks of the regular season got canceled, Marchand was on pace to have a second consecutive 100 point season and second in his NHL career altogether. During the pause, Marchand was concerned that the NHL would attempt to resume operations too quickly, leading to "really, really ugly" games as unprepared skaters began playing without sufficient practice time. When the NHL resumed operations for the 2020 playoffs in late-July, Marchand was one of 31 Bruins invited to play in the Toronto quarantine "bubble". Despite Marchand scoring six goals in as many games during the 2020 playoffs, the Bruins fell to the eventual Stanley Cup champion Tampa Bay Lightning in the second round. At the end of the season, Marchand was named the Bruins' Third Star, while his three-year streak of winning the Elizabeth Dufresne Trophy came to an end when the award went to Pastrňák. The NHL also named Marchand to their 2019–20 second All-Star team.

On September 14, 2020, Marchand underwent a sports hernia surgery that carried an expected four-month recovery time, leaving it in question whether he would be available for the start of the pandemic-shortened 2020–21 season. On January 7, 2021, Marchand was also named alternate captain of the Bruins, serving alongside David Krejčí as Patrice Bergeron filled the captain vacancy left by Zdeno Chára after the latter left the Bruins and signed with the Washington Capitals in free agency. Marchand revealed that the sports hernia injury had been causing him pain for two and a half years, ended up on track to return to the Bruins at full strength for their January 14 home opener against the New Jersey Devils, in which he scored the team's first goal of the season on Devils' goaltender Mackenzie Blackwood and also recording an assist on a Nick Ritchie goal later on in the game as the Bruins won the game 3–2. On March 27, Marchand was placed on the NHL COVID protocol list, allowing young player Trent Frederic a chance to occupy his position on the top line with Bergeron and Pastrňák. He returned after two missed games, revealing that a false positive test had placed him on the list. By the end of the abbreviated season, Marchand played in 53 games and led the team with 29 goals and 40 assists for 63 points, as well as four shorthanded goals and five game-winning goals. He was the Bruins' First Star at their awards banquet, and also took home both his fourth Elizabeth Dufresne Trophy and second Eddie Shore Award. Marchand continued to score game-winning goals in the 2021 playoffs, first an overtime goal in game two of the first round against the Washington Capitals, followed by another overtime shot in game three of the second round, against the New York Islanders. His game two overtime goal was only 39 seconds into the period, breaking Bobby Orr's 1970 record for the fastest overtime game-winning goal in Bruins postseason history. Orr scored 40 seconds into game four of the 1970 Stanley Cup Final against the St. Louis Blues, clinching the Bruins' fourth championship. Marchand scored two goals in the Bruins' game six loss to the Islanders, tying with Peter McNab for the most goals in Bruins elimination games with nine. Although he finished fifth in Hart Trophy voting, with Edmonton Oilers forward and captain Connor McDavid as a unanimous first selection and winner, Marchand was named to the 2021 All-NHL First Team at the end of June.

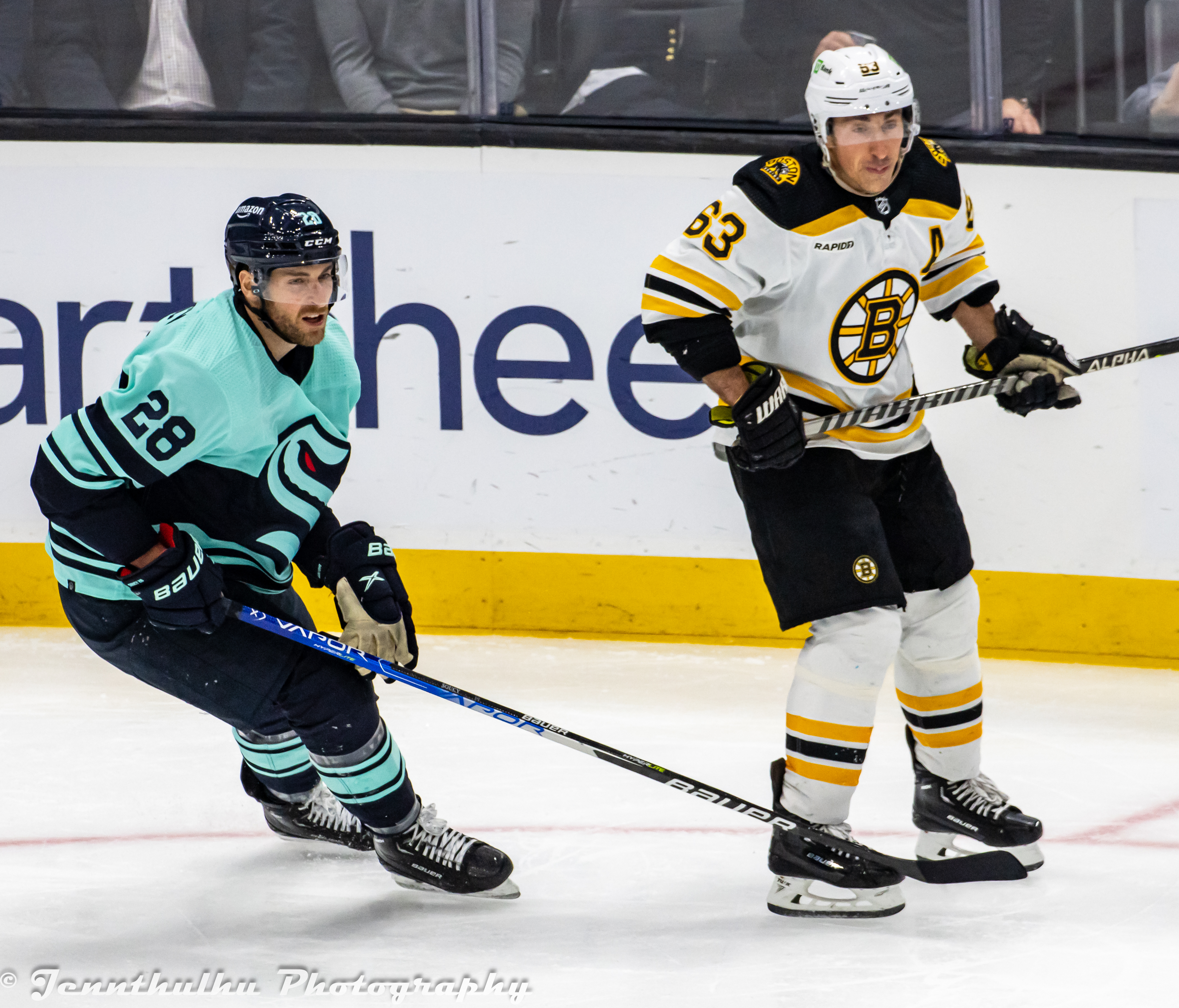
Marchand (right) skating against Carson Soucy in February 2023

During the first home game of the Bruins' 2021–22 season on October 16, 2021, Marchand scored a goal on a penalty shot that he was awarded after Dallas Stars defenceman Ryan Suter was called for holding on an attempted Marchand breakaway. Marchand became the third player in NHL history to score the first goal of a team's season on a penalty shot, following Mats Sundin of the Toronto Maple Leafs in October 2006 and former Bruin teammate Chris Kelly for the Bruins in October 2013, respectively. On November 29, Marchand received the seventh suspension of his NHL career when he was penalized for three games after slew-footing Oliver Ekman-Larsson of the Vancouver Canucks. Marchand was not penalized during the game, and Ekman-Larsson was not injured. On December 14, Marchand and Craig Smith were placed into COVID-19 protocols. Four days later and amidst a larger team outbreak, the Boston Bruins' season was suspended through the annual Christmas break. Marchand was suspended for the second time that season and eighth time in his career on February 9, 2022, when he received a six-game ban for roughing and high-sticking goaltender Tristan Jarry of the Pittsburgh Penguins. In the final minute of the game, which the Bruins lost 4–2, Jarry made a comment to Marchand, who responded by punching the goaltender in the head and hitting him with his stick, earning Marchand a match penalty, which are handed out when the officials deem an "intent to injure". In a press conference on February 11, Marchand said that he believed his actions were "stupid" but were not "suspension-worthy", and said he was considering appealing the suspension.

Marchand underwent hip arthroscopy and labral repair on both hips right after the Bruins first round exit in the 2022 playoffs in May 2022 and was expected to miss six months, where he had a return table around late November of the 2022–23 season. He returned one month early of his initial plan, however, making his season debut on October 27, 2022, where he scored two goals and had an assist in a win against the Detroit Red Wings. Marchand contributed significantly to the Bruins' season that saw the team break the all-time record for wins (65) and points (135) in an NHL season. Despite missing nine games, Marchand finished second in points on the team with 67, scoring 21 goals and earning 46 assists in 73 contests. The team's season ended after the first round of the 2023 playoffs, however, as they lost to the eighth-seeded Florida Panthers in seven games after initially holding a 3–1 series lead. Marchand exited the playoffs with 10 points, tied with Tyler Bertuzzi for the most on the Bruins.

With the retirements of both David Krejčí and longtime linemate and close friend Patrice Bergeron during the 2023 off-season, Marchand, along with Milan Lucic (who returned to Boston in 2023 in free agency), became the last active players from the Stanley Cup-winning 2010–11 Bruins roster still playing for the team. On September 20, 2023, in advance of the 2023–24 season, Marchand was named captain of the Bruins, succeeding the recently retired Patrice Bergeron. On November 18, Marchand recorded his 500th NHL assist on a Charlie McAvoy goal in a 5–2 victory over the Montreal Canadiens. On February 13, 2024, Marchand played his 1,000th NHL game in a 3–2 shootout loss to the Tampa Bay Lightning, becoming only the eighth player in Bruins history to play 1,000 games with the team. In the game, he recorded assists on both goals by Boston from Charlie McAvoy and James van Riemsdyk, respectively. On April 4, Marchand recorded his 400th NHL goal in a 4–1 Bruins win over the Carolina Hurricanes on Hurricanes goaltender Frederik Andersen to become the fifth player in Bruins history to reach the marker. He finished the season playing in all 82 games and recording 29 goals and 38 assists for 67 points as the Bruins clinched the fourth seed in the East. With a two-goal performance in game three of the first round of the 2024 playoffs against the Toronto Maple Leafs, Marchand tied Cam Neely for most playoff goals in Bruins history, with 55. In game four, Marchand recorded his 56th career playoff goal to pass Neely for sole possession for most playoff goals in Bruins history. Marchand and the Bruins would defeat the fifth-seeded Maple Leafs in seven games. In the first period of game three of the Bruins second round matchup against the second-seeded and eventual Stanley Cup champion Florida Panthers, Marchand was the target of a sucker punch hit by Sam Bennett. Marchand was injured on the play, and although he attempted to continue to play, he was later taken out of the game. Marchand missed Games 4 and 5 of the series as a result of the injury. There was no penalty called on Bennett during the play, as well as no disciplinary action by the NHL Department of Player Safety, raising concerns about the NHL's approach to the series. Many NHL personalities spoke out against the hit and the NHL response, such as former NHL referee Tim Peel, and former NHL players and current analysts Paul Bissonnette and Colby Armstrong (of the Spittin' Chiclets podcast), and Bruins general manager Don Sweeney. Marchand would return for game six of the series, but the Bruins would lose, and thus got eliminated by the Panthers for the second straight season, this time in the second round.

On September 3, 2024, Marchand revealed he had undergone three separate surgeries earlier in the 2024 off-season to repair sports hernias in both his groin and abdomen, which he suffered towards the end of the 2023–24 season, along with a torn tendon in his elbow, which he first sustained in the 2023 off-season and which he played through the entire previous 2023–24 season. On October 26, 2024, in a 4–3 overtime win over the Toronto Maple Leafs, Marchand recorded the overtime winner and his first goal of the 2024–25 season with the goal on Maple Leafs' goaltender Anthony Stolarz. This would mark the 20th overtime winning goal for Marchand, making him the third player in NHL history to record at least 20 overtime winning goals throughout a career, joining Pittsburgh Penguins forward and captain Sidney Crosby and Washington Capitals forward and captain Alexander Ovechkin.

==== Florida Panthers (2025–present) ====
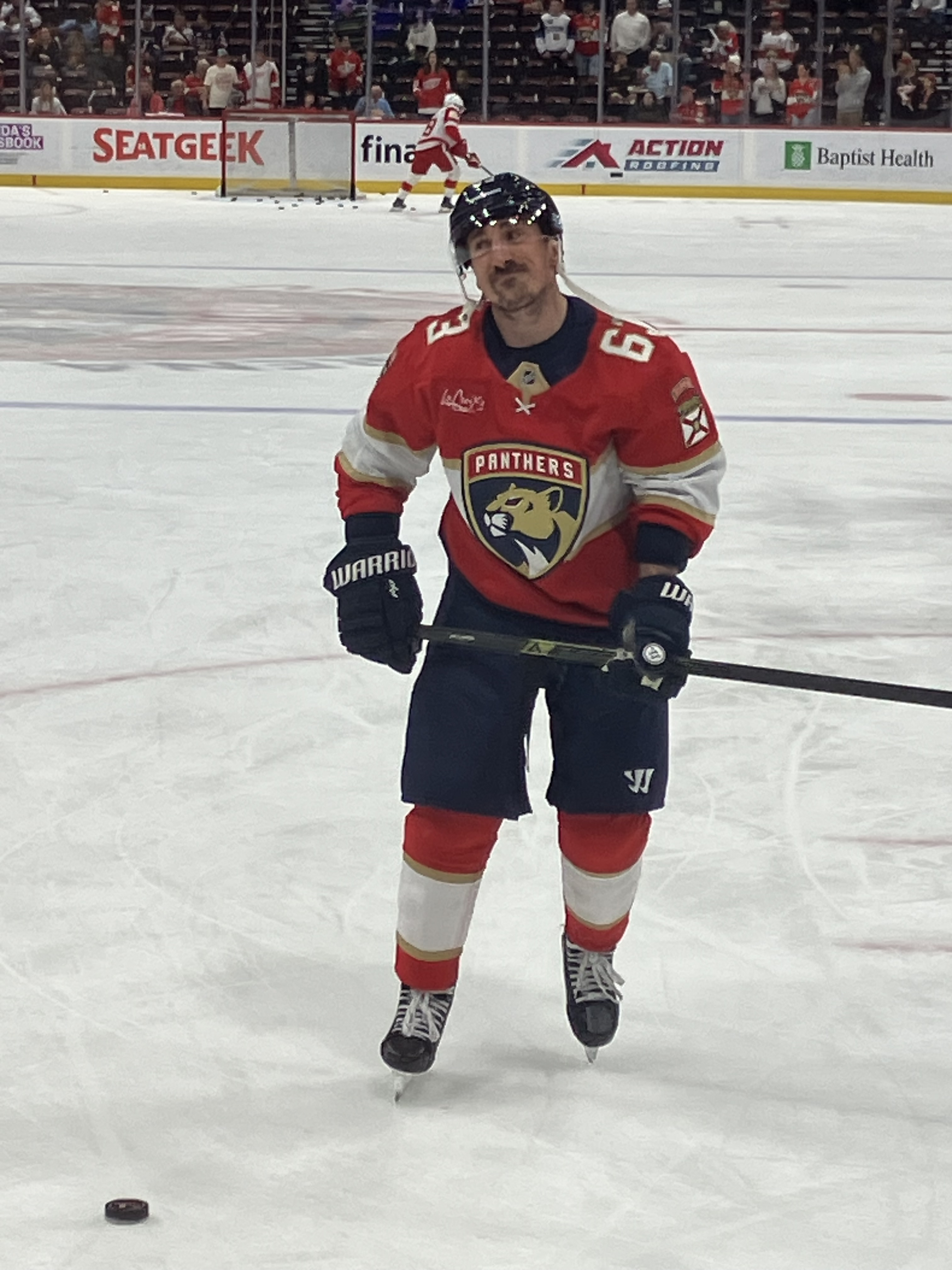
Marchand with the Florida Panthers in April 2025

On March 7, 2025, Marchand was traded to the Florida Panthers in exchange for a conditional 2027 second-round pick, and the Bruins retained 50 percent of Marchand’s contract. Due to an injury suffered against the Pittsburgh Penguins one week prior, Marchand did not immediately play for the Panthers. He returned from injury a couple weeks later, and made his Panthers debut on March 28, where he assisted on the overtime game-winning goal against the Utah Hockey Club. Marchand scored his first playoff goal for the Panthers on May 7, the second Florida goal in a 4–3 loss to Toronto in game two of the second round of the playoffs. During the Panthers' series against the Maple Leafs, Marchand played in his 13th career game seven, tying him with Scott Stevens for the second all-time in NHL playoff history. It was also his fifth game seven against the Maple Leafs. He scored two assists and an empty net goal in a 6–1 victory over Toronto, which gave him his eighth career game seven victory, tying him for first all-time. With the win, Marchand became the first player in NHL history to win five winner-take-all games over the same franchise, having beaten the Maple Leafs in a game seven in 2013, 2018, 2019, and 2024 as well. Marchand scored a goal and an assist in five games in the Eastern Conference Final against the Carolina Hurricanes to return to the Stanley Cup Final for the fourth time in his career.

In the Finals against the Edmonton Oilers, in game two, Marchand scored on a shorthanded breakaway, then in double-overtime, scored the winner on another breakaway, to tie the series 1–1. The Panthers would go on to win their second consecutive Stanley Cup against the Oilers for Marchand's second career championship. Across 23 playoff games, Marchand recorded 10 goals and 10 assists for 20 points, three game-winning goals, and a plus-minus of +17, tying for the 32nd highest plus-minus in a single playoff season. Marchand's performance made him a finalist for the Conn Smythe Trophy as the playoff MVP but the award was ultimately given to teammate Sam Bennett.

On July 1, 2025, Marchand opted to forgo free agency and signed a six-year, $31.5 million contract to remain with the Panthers. In late October 2025, Marchand briefly stepped away from the team to guest coach a tribute game in the Nova Scotia U18 Major Hockey League for the late daughter of his longtime trainer and friend JP MacCallum.

On November 14, 2025, Marchand recorded his 1,000th career NHL point during a 6-3 home victory for the Panthers over the Washington Capitals. He produced two assists, with the milestone assist coming on an empty-net goal by Eetu Luostarinen with under two minutes remaining. In early March 2026, it was announced that Marchand would be reviewed for potential surgery due to a lower body injury that he had been maintaining and playing with for an extended time. On March 31, it was concerned that while Marchand would not have surgery for his injury he would remain out for the remainder of the 2025–26 season. He had been second on the team in scoring prior to his injury with 27 goals and assists for 54 points, ranking third on the team in points.

On October 6, 2026, Marchand suffered an left knee injury, during a game against the Los Angeles Kings. The injury was assessed as likely to sideline him for 5 to 6 weeks. As of mid-November, Marchand was reported to have rejoined team practice.

== International play ==
Medal record

Men's ice hockey

Representing Canada

Winter Olympics
Silver medal – second place	2026 Milano Cortina	

IIHF World Championship
Gold medal – first place	2016 Russia	

World Cup of Hockey
Gold medal – first place	2016 Toronto	

4 Nations Face-Off
Winner	2025 Canada/United States	

World Junior Championships
Gold medal – first place	2008 Czech Republic	
Gold medal – first place	2007 Sweden	

U-18 Junior World Cup
Gold medal – first place	2005 Czech Republic/Slovakia	

Super Series
Gold medal – first place	2007 Canada/Russia	

Representing Canada Atlantic

World U-17 Hockey Challenge
Bronze medal – third place	2005 Alberta	

Marchand first competed internationally for the 2005 World U-17 Hockey Challenge, winning a bronze medal with Team Canada Atlantic. As a prospect, Marchand went on to represent Canada twice at the IIHF World Junior Championship: the 2007 WJC in Sweden, and again at the 2008 WJC in the Czech Republic. Both times, Canada took home a gold medal. After his performance in the 2007 World Juniors, Marchand was named one of four alternate captains for Canada in the 2008 tournament.

As an adult, Marchand was one of three members of the Bruins to attend the 2016 IIHF World Championship in Russia: he represented Canada, while Pastrňák represented the Czech Republic and Providence Bruins skater Frank Vatrano played for Team USA. Canada took first place in the tournament after defeating the previously undefeated Finnish team in a gold medal match that saw Marchand fight Leo Komarov of the Toronto Maple Leafs. On May 27, 2016, Marchand was named to Team Canada's roster for the 2016 World Cup of Hockey, joined by his teammate Patrice Bergeron. During the tournament, he played on a line with Bergeron and Sidney Crosby of the Penguins, combining for 25 points in six games. Marchand led the tournament with five goals and three assists. His short-handed goal against Team Europe in the World Cup Final clinched a gold medal for Canada, something that Marchand and his teammates hoped would establish the skater as a strong player rather than a pest.

In 2025, Marchand was selected to represent Canada at the 4 Nations Face-Off, a new round-robin competition organized by the NHL as a replacement for the annual All-Star Game. In the first game against Sweden in Montreal on February 12, Marchand scored Canada's second goal in a 4–3 overtime victory. In the following game against the United States, Marchand would be designated an alternate captain of the team as Colorado Avalanche defenceman Cale Makar was ruled out of the fixture due to illness, though Canada would lose 3-1. Makar would return and reclaim the alternate captaincy for the following game, a must-win match against Finland, during which Marchand would fail to register a point despite a 5-3 Canadian victory. As a result of the game, Canada would qualify for the final, a rematch against the United States at Marchand's home arena with the Bruins, TD Garden. Marchand would play a largely peripheral role during the match, playing on the fourth line, but generated a handful of excellent opportunities and was unlucky not to score. Canada would go on to win the game 3-2 in overtime, with Marchand playing a prominent role in the team's ensuing celebrations.

On December 31, 2025, he was named to Canada's roster to compete at the 2026 Winter Olympics. During the games, Marchand was held out of two of the games, and had one assist in four games. Canada won the silver medal, losing to the United States in overtime.

== Playing style and criticism ==
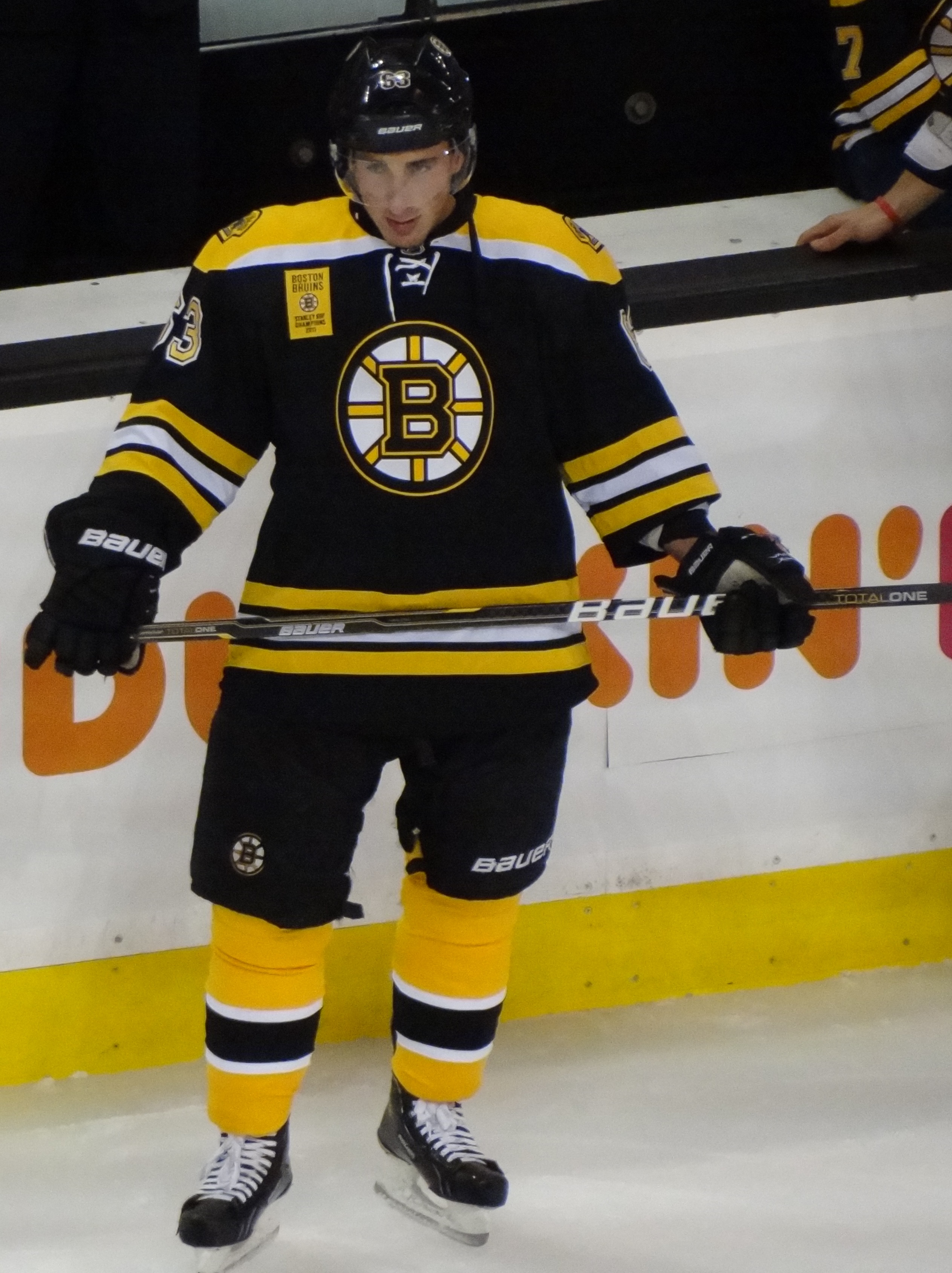
Marchand warming up with the Bruins in October 2011

Throughout his NHL career, Marchand has been characterized as a "pest", a hockey player who frustrates his opponents through physical or verbal attacks and annoyance. Marchand developed many of his agitation tactics from a young age: he knew that he was smaller than many of his opponents at only 5 feet 9 inches (1.75 m) and 180 pounds (82 kg), and subsequently developed a system of hits and trash talking that would give him an advantage over some of the larger players. Marchand has modelled his behaviour after that of Theo Fleury, a 5 feet 6 inches (1.68 m) former pest who was able to leverage the frustration that he caused his opponents into offensive production. In March 2017, teammate John-Michael Liles described Marchand by saying "He's a guy that you hate playing against but you love having on your team ... He comes to the rink every day wanting to get better". In May 2019, teammate David Backes called the skater "the motor on [the Bruins]", while then-head coach Bruce Cassidy has noted that, although it may appear undisciplined, many of Marchand's tactics are calculated to get under the target's skin.

Marchand's agitation tactics have drawn criticism from fans and opponents. A January 2020 poll of 392 players across the NHL declared Marchand the "dirtiest player in the league", receiving 29 per cent of the vote. In the same player poll by March 2020, Marchand was voted both the best and worst trash-talker in the NHL, with 25.87 percent of players voting him as the league's best and 10.59 per cent voting him as the worst. When the Bruins visited the White House in January 2012 after their Stanley Cup victory seven months earlier, President of the United States Barack Obama referred to Marchand as a "Little Ball of Hate", a nickname that he has since embraced. His other nicknames include "The Rat", inherited from previous Bruins pest Ken Linseman, "Ratboy", for his relentless style of play, "Nose Face Killah", a famous phase playing on the Wu-Tang Clan rapper "Ghostface Killah", making fun of his prominent nose, and "Leg Sweeper", for his frequent tactic of slew footing his opponents.

In recent years, Marchand has tried to move past his reputation as an agitator and focus more on stats and productivity. While he first emerged in superstar like form in the 2011 playoffs en route to the Bruins 2011 Stanley Cup championship with 11 goals and eight assists for 19 points in all 25 games before having his first break-out regular season in the 2011–12 season where he recorded 28 goals, 27 assists and 55 points in 76 games played, it wasn't until the 2015–16 season when he officially became a bonafide star for the Bruins and for the NHL when he scored 37 goals, 24 assists and 61 points in 77 games played. In September 2016, just before the 2016–17 season began, he helped win the gold medal for Canada at the World Cup of Hockey, cementing his reputation as a strong skater and goal scorer in addition to an agitator. Increased scrutiny from the NHL has also led Marchand to back away from some of his agitation: at the start of the 2017–18 season, Marchand told reporters that he and his teammates were limiting their "chirps" and other trash-talking comments to increase the family-friendly atmosphere of the NHL. After a series of suspensions in the 2017–18 season campaign followed by a highly publicized controversy over Marchand's decision to lick his opponents in the 2018 playoffs, the skater made a conscious effort to stay out of trouble during the 2018–19 season, citing a desire "to make sure the longevity is there, that I'm not getting pushed out of the League because of stupidity". Between 2018 and 2021, Marchand has become one of the top-scoring left wings in the NHL, with his 163 assists and 256 points the most of any skater in the position during the 2018–19, 2019–20 and 2020–21 seasons combined. In the 2019 playoffs, he was also tied with Ryan O'Reilly of the St. Louis Blues for league leader in points with 23 points recorded (nine goals, 14 assists) while O' Reilly recorded 23 points (eight goals and 15 assists) as the Bruins would lose to the Blues in seven games in the 2019 Stanley Cup Final, falling one win short of a second Stanley Cup.

Despite these successes, Marchand continues to employ pest tactics as an essential component of his game. One recent example occurred during the December 19, 2025, game between the Florida Panthers and the Carolina Hurricanes, when Marchand hit Brandon Bussi, goalie for the Carolina Hurricanes, in the crotch with his stick while Bussi's head was turned to focus on the play.

== Personal life ==
Marchand and former Bruins teammate Kevan Miller, both avid crossbow hunters, own an outdoor sports company called March & Mill Co. In November 2020, they purchased a sports outfitter lodge on Beothuk Lake in Newfoundland, with the intention of offering hunting and fishing expeditions in the province.

Marchand married his wife Katrina in September 2015. He has two daughters and a stepson.

== Career statistics ==
=== Regular season and playoffs ===
Bold indicates led league

			Regular season					Playoffs
Season	Team	League	GP	G	A	Pts	PIM	GP	G	A	Pts	PIM
2003–04	Dartmouth Subways Midget AAA	NSAAA	49	47	42	89	64	—	—	—	—	—
2004–05	Moncton Wildcats	QMJHL	61	9	20	29	52	11	1	0	1	7
2005–06	Moncton Wildcats	QMJHL	68	29	37	66	83	20	5	14	19	34
2006–07	Val–d'Or Foreurs	QMJHL	57	33	47	80	108	20	**16**	**24**	**40**	36
2007–08	Val–d'Or Foreurs	QMJHL	33	21	23	44	36	—	—	—	—	—
2007–08	Halifax Mooseheads	QMJHL	26	11	19	30	40	14	3	16	19	18
2008–09	Providence Bruins	AHL	79	18	41	59	67	16	7	8	15	26
2009–10	Providence Bruins	AHL	34	13	19	32	51	—	—	—	—	—
2009–10	Boston Bruins	NHL	20	0	1	1	20	—	—	—	—	—
2010–11	Boston Bruins	NHL	77	21	20	41	51	25	11	8	19	40
2011–12	Boston Bruins	NHL	76	28	27	55	87	7	1	1	2	2
2012–13	Boston Bruins	NHL	45	18	18	36	27	22	4	9	13	21
2013–14	Boston Bruins	NHL	82	25	28	53	64	12	0	5	5	18
2014–15	Boston Bruins	NHL	77	24	18	42	95	—	—	—	—	—
2015–16	Boston Bruins	NHL	77	37	24	61	90	—	—	—	—	—
2016–17	Boston Bruins	NHL	80	39	46	85	81	6	1	3	4	6
2017–18	Boston Bruins	NHL	68	34	51	85	63	12	4	13	17	16
2018–19	Boston Bruins	NHL	79	36	64	100	96	24	9	14	**23**	14
2019–20	Boston Bruins	NHL	70	28	59	87	82	13	7	5	12	2
2020–21	Boston Bruins	NHL	53	29	40	69	46	11	8	4	12	12
2021–22	Boston Bruins	NHL	70	32	48	80	97	7	4	7	11	10
2022–23	Boston Bruins	NHL	73	21	46	67	74	7	4	6	10	2
2023–24	Boston Bruins	NHL	82	29	38	67	78	11	3	7	10	16
2024–25	Boston Bruins	NHL	61	21	26	47	62	—	—	—	—	—
2024–25	Florida Panthers	NHL	10	2	2	4	2	23	10	10	20	48
2025–26	Florida Panthers	NHL	52	27	27	54	38	—	—	—	—	—
NHL totals			1,152	451	583	1,034	1,153	180	66	92	158	207

=== International ===
Bold indicates led tournament

Year	Team	Event	Result	GP	G	A	Pts	PIM
2005	Canada Atlantic	U17	3rd place, bronze medalist(s)	6	5	6	11	10
2005	Canada	U18	1st place, gold medalist(s)	5	2	2	4	16
2007	Canada	WJC	1st place, gold medalist(s)	6	2	0	2	2
2007	Canada	SS	1st place, gold medalist(s)	6	3	3	6	26
2008	Canada	WJC	1st place, gold medalist(s)	7	4	2	6	4
2016	Canada	WC	1st place, gold medalist(s)	10	4	3	7	10
2016	Canada	WCH	1st place, gold medalist(s)	6	**5**	3	8	8
2025	Canada	4NF	1st place, gold medalist(s)	4	1	0	1	0
2026	Canada	OG	2nd place, silver medalist(s)	4	0	1	1	0
Junior totals				30	16	13	29	58
Senior totals				24	10	7	17	18

== Awards, honours and records ==
Award	Year	Reference(s)
QMJHL
Moncton Wildcats Rookie of the Year	2005	
President's Cup champion	2006	
AHL
AHL Rookie of the Month (January)	2009	
NHL
Stanley Cup champion	2011, 2025	
NHL All-Star Game	2017, 2018	
NHL First All-Star Team	2017, 2021	
NHL Second All-Star Team	2019, 2020	
International
IIHF World Championship Top 3 Player on Team	2016	
Boston Bruins
Seventh Player Award	2011, 2016	
Elizabeth C. Dufresne Trophy	2012, 2017, 2018, 2019, 2021	
John P. Bucyk Award	2012	
Eddie Shore Award	2014, 2021	
Bruins Three Stars Awards	2015, 2017, 2018, 2019, 2020, 2021, 2022, 2023, 2024	
Named One of Top 100 Best Bruins Players of all Time	2024	
Boston Bruins All-Centennial Team	2024	

=== Records ===
- Most overtime goals in Bruins history (21)
- Most shorthanded goals in Bruins history (36)
- Most shorthanded points in Bruins history (59)
- Most goals in playoff elimination games in Bruins history (10)
- Fastest postseason overtime goal in Bruins history (39 seconds)
- First overtime penalty-shot goal in Bruins history (February 6, 2016)
- Most suspensions in NHL history (eighth recorded on February 8, 2022)
- Most playoff goals in Bruins history (56)
- Oldest player to score in the first three games of a Stanley Cup Final series.

== See also ==
- List of NHL players with 1,000 games played
- List of NHL players with 100-point seasons
- List of NHL players with 1,000 points

Sporting positions
Preceded by Patrice Bergeron	Boston Bruins captain 2023–2025	Succeeded by David Pastrňák
