= Sherwood, Nova Scotia =

Community in Nova Scotia, Canada

Coordinates: 44°43′12.1″N 64°18′6.4″W

Sherwood in Nova Scotia

Sherwood is a community in the province of Nova Scotia, Canada, located in the Chester Municipal District. It is located at the crossroads of Highway 14 and the Old Annapolis Road near Card Lake. The community was established by disbanded British soldiers in 1816 led by Lt. John Evans who named it for his original home in Sherwood, England. Few of the disbanded soldiers remained in the community but they were succeeded by families from Chester and the Tancook Islands.

== Parks ==
- Card Lake Provincial Park
