= New Ross, Nova Scotia =

New Ross
- Community
- Location of New Ross, Nova Scotia New Ross (Canada)
- Coordinates: 44°44′13″N 64°27′23″W
- Country: Canada
- Province: Nova Scotia
- County: Lunenburg County
- Settled as Sherbrooke: August 7, 1816
- Renamed New Ross: 1863
- Electoral Districts Federal: South Shore—St. Margaret's
- Provincial: Chester-St. Margaret's

Population (2012)
  - Total: about 1,700
- Time zone: UTC-4 (AST)
  - Summer (DST): UTC-3 (ADT)
- Postal code(s): BOJ
- Area code: 2M0
- Website: newross.ca

New Ross is a community in the Canadian province of Nova Scotia, located in the Chester Municipal District. It is home to Ross Farm Museum, a living history agricultural museum. Some localities of New Ross have colloquial names, including Charing Cross, Seffernville, Harriston, Aaldersville, the Forties Settlement, Mill Road, Leville, New Russell, Lake Ramsay, and Fraxville.

== Name ==
The settlement was named Sherbrooke after Sir John Coape Sherbrooke who was Lieutenant Governor at the time, and renamed New Ross in 1863 after Earl Henry Phipps of Mulgrave, whose second title derives its name from New Ross, Ireland. This was due to there being another Sherbrooke in Guysborough County.

== History ==
Prior to the arrival of the former Fencibles, the Mi'kmaq were the only inhabitants of what is now New Ross, and the limited number in the area had numerous friendly interactions with the new settlers. New Ross 20 and Pennal 19 are reservations of the Sipekneꞌkatik First Nation in the vicinity.

The community was settled in 1816 by a disbanding group of 172 soldiers of the Nova Scotia Fencibles as Sherbrooke, principally among them Captain William Ross. Although all in service of the British Army, the soldiers were of varied backgrounds and previous military experience including men of Irish, English, and German heritage and later settlers included men from the 60th German Regiment of Foot, Newfoundland Fencibles, and a small number from the 1st and 14th Regiments of Foot. Due to this, many of these men saw service in the West Indies, Europe, and elsewhere. Some of these soldiers married local wives where they were deployed and brought them to New Ross. In return for their service in the War of 1812 and in hopes of settling the interior of Nova Scotia, Governor George Ramsay, Earl of Dalhousie granted land to the soldiers and their families between Chester and Kentville.

Ross was granted the area which now constitutes the community of New Ross and the title of deputy surveyor of lands. The soldiers were also given rations, tools, and seeds in order to start farmsteads. Rations were discontinued within the first few years of settlement, and by 1819 only 68 families remained in the region. Despite the vast majority of settlers leaving, those who remained firmly established themselves in the region. In time some settlements were given their own colloquial names, such as Glengarry and Sherwood.

Anglican, Baptist, and Catholic churches were all founded within the first 15 years.

New Ross was the endpoint for construction of the Western segment of the Annapolis Road which was intended to eventually reach Halifax, though it was never completed.

In the early 1800s, barrel making and lumber were the biggest industries of the community, with the Gold River being used to transport logs. Later in the 19th century, gold and manganese mining became prevalent in the region. Many gristmills and other mills associated with the lumber industry were constructed in the area. From the start of the 20th century to this day, forestry is the biggest industry in the area.

A monument marking the centennial of New Ross was erected in the center of the town crossroads in 1916 but has been moved and is now preserved by the New Ross Historical Society.

The Ross Farm Museum was opened in 1969 and operates as a living museum operating the farm as it would have been in the late 1800s. Numerous historical letters and diaries from the Ross family dating back to their arrival were found in its attic, which have been preserved by the Nova Scotia Archives and are viewable online.

== Education ==
Numerous one-room schoolhouses have existed throughout New Ross. Since 1960 however, the area has been served by the New Ross Consolidated School.

== New Ross Castle ==
In the 1970s, a New Ross property owner uncovered stone foundations of unknown origin and steel tools on their property. A 1985 excavation by two Parks Canada archaeologists concluded that nothing from the site dated earlier than the 19th century, many surrounding foundations appeared more recent, and the site was deemed unworthy of further official excavation.

Despite this, the property owner and others have posited that the site may have been Viking ruins, a hideout for exiled nobles after the English Civil War, or a base built by the 14th century Scottish Earl Henry Sinclair and surviving members of the Knights Templar while in possession of the Holy Grail. From this latter theory, the site has been associated with the Oak Island mystery, including appearing in the reality TV show The Curse of Oak Island.

In response to several pseudohistorical books on the subject, former Nova Scotia archivist, government Head of Heritage, and local historian Dr. Brian Cuthbertson concluded in 1994 using historical maps and letters the site was of an early 19th century blacksmith shop. A paper on the fringe theories of the site by current Nova Scotia Museum Assistant Curator of Archaeology Vanessa Smith concluded that the theories lacked physical and historic evidence and constituted pseudoarchaeology.
