= Five Island Lake, Nova Scotia =

Locality in Nova Scotia, Canada

Coordinates: 44°40′18.58″N 63°47′48.91″W

Five Island Lake in Nova Scotia

Five Island Lake is a locality in the Halifax Regional Municipality in Nova Scotia, Canada. It is situated west of the city of Halifax and east of St. Margaret's Bay.
