= Pockwock Lake =

Lake in Nova Scotia, Canada

- Interactive map of Pockwock Lake
- Location: Halifax County, Hants County
- Coordinates: 44°47′57″N 63°50′15″W
- Type: Glacial
- Basin countries: Canada
- Max. length: 6.96 km (22,800 ft)
- Max. width: 2.28 km (7,500 ft)

Pockwock Lake is a glacial lake located in both Halifax County and Hants County, Nova Scotia, Canada, adjacent to Pockwock. It is connected to Little Pockwock Lake by a stream. The lake has an associated wilderness area named Pockwock Wilderness Area, and has a associated river named Pockwock River, that connects Wright Lake to Pockwock Lake. It was named on September 2, 1921.

Swimming, bathing, washing, or cutting ice at any time in any lake, tributary to Pockwock Lake, or any watercourse located within the Protected Water Area is prohibited at all times.

== Etymology ==
Pockwock Lake is from the Indian word "Pogwek," meaning "the smoky" or "dry lake."

== Geography ==
Pockwock Lake is measured approximately 6.96 kilometres (4.32 mi) in length, and 2.28 kilometres (1.42 mi) in width. It contains four named islands: Haverstock Island, Sand Cove Island, Pompeys Island, and Upper Pompeys Island. The lake also has six named coves: Moose Cove, Peggy Cove, Melvin Cove, Gowans Cove, Sand Cove, and Ponhook Cove.

== Water quality ==
Water quality monitoring of Pockwock Lake conducted between 2006 and 2008 recorded pH values ranging between approximately 4.8 and 5.5. A provincial assessment found that with the exception of parameters such as pH, aluminum, manganese, and turbidity, water quality at deep-lake monitoring stations met Canadian Council of Ministers of the Environment guidelines for drinking water use and freshwater aquatic life.

== Access ==
Pockwock Lake can be accessed via Nova Scotia Route 213 and Nova Scotia Route 101, as well as several minor forest trails.

== See also ==
- List of lakes of Nova Scotia
