= Pockwock, Nova Scotia =

Black Nova Scotian settlement in Upper Hammonds Plains in Canada

Coordinates: 44°46′35.31″N 63°51′14.08″W

Pockwock in Nova Scotia

Pockwock is one of four Black Nova Scotian settlements in Upper Hammonds Plains. People in this area are mostly descendants of War of 1812 refugees. It is located in the Halifax Regional Municipality in the Canadian province of Nova Scotia. The Halifax Regional Water Commission uses Pockwock Lake as a source for water for the communities of Halifax, Bedford and Lower Sackville.

Pockwock is underlain by slate-derived loam of the Bridgewater soil series, a well drained podzol which is better for agriculture than the neighbouring granite and quartzite-derived soils which are widespread nearby.

== Climate ==
Climate data for Pockwock (1981–2010)
Month	Jan	Feb	Mar	Apr	May	Jun	Jul	Aug	Sep	Oct	Nov	Dec	Year
Record high °C (°F)	14.5 (58.1)	17.5 (63.5)	23.0 (73.4)	24.5 (76.1)	32.5 (90.5)	34.0 (93.2)	33.0 (91.4)	35.0 (95.0)	34.0 (93.2)	25.5 (77.9)	19.0 (66.2)	16.0 (60.8)	35.0 (95.0)
Mean daily maximum °C (°F)	−1.8 (28.8)	−0.7 (30.7)	2.9 (37.2)	8.5 (47.3)	15.0 (59.0)	20.2 (68.4)	23.6 (74.5)	23.3 (73.9)	19.0 (66.2)	13.0 (55.4)	7.0 (44.6)	1.5 (34.7)	11.0 (51.8)
Daily mean °C (°F)	−6.2 (20.8)	−5.1 (22.8)	−1.3 (29.7)	4.1 (39.4)	9.9 (49.8)	14.9 (58.8)	18.5 (65.3)	18.5 (65.3)	14.5 (58.1)	8.8 (47.8)	3.3 (37.9)	−2.4 (27.7)	6.5 (43.7)
Mean daily minimum °C (°F)	−10.6 (12.9)	−9.5 (14.9)	−5.6 (21.9)	−0.3 (31.5)	4.7 (40.5)	9.6 (49.3)	13.3 (55.9)	13.7 (56.7)	10.0 (50.0)	4.6 (40.3)	−0.4 (31.3)	−6.3 (20.7)	1.9 (35.4)
Record low °C (°F)	−29.0 (−20.2)	−36.0 (−32.8)	−22.5 (−8.5)	−13.0 (8.6)	−4.0 (24.8)	0.5 (32.9)	6.0 (42.8)	4.0 (39.2)	−2.0 (28.4)	−5.0 (23.0)	−12.5 (9.5)	−24.5 (−12.1)	−36.0 (−32.8)
Average precipitation mm (inches)	149.0 (5.87)	126.8 (4.99)	138.9 (5.47)	119.9 (4.72)	129.3 (5.09)	100.9 (3.97)	99.5 (3.92)	87.3 (3.44)	118.0 (4.65)	139.2 (5.48)	158.7 (6.25)	145.7 (5.74)	1,513.2 (59.57)
Average rainfall mm (inches)	94.2 (3.71)	79.2 (3.12)	101.1 (3.98)	109.2 (4.30)	128.6 (5.06)	100.9 (3.97)	99.5 (3.92)	87.3 (3.44)	118.0 (4.65)	139.2 (5.48)	142.0 (5.59)	105.6 (4.16)	1,304.7 (51.37)
Average snowfall cm (inches)	54.4 (21.4)	46.8 (18.4)	36.1 (14.2)	10.5 (4.1)	0.7 (0.3)	0.0 (0.0)	0.0 (0.0)	0.0 (0.0)	0.0 (0.0)	0.0 (0.0)	16.5 (6.5)	39.6 (15.6)	204.7 (80.6)
Average precipitation days (≥ 0.2 mm)	15.0	11.9	13.9	15.7	16.5	14.2	13.7	13.5	13.6	16.1	16.7	16.2	177.0
Average rainy days (≥ 0.2 mm)	7.3	6.3	9.7	14.4	16.5	14.2	13.7	13.5	13.6	16.1	15.4	10.4	151.6
Average snowy days (≥ 0.2 cm)	8.8	6.7	5.5	2.2	0.20	0.0	0.0	0.0	0.0	0.04	1.9	7.0	32.3
Source: Environment Canada
