= Upper Hammonds Plains, Nova Scotia =

Canadian suburban community

Coordinates: 44°45′16″N 63°50′30″W

Upper Hammonds Plains (2011 population: 1,840) is a Canadian suburban community located in Nova Scotia's Halifax Regional Municipality.

The community is situated along Pockwock Road and is considered one of the most historic communities for Black Nova Scotians. There were 330 residents who identified themselves as having black ancestry in the 2006 census. The community is named after the Governor of Nova Scotia Sir Andrew Hamond, 1st Baronet.

Its border is defined by the Government of Nova Scotia and it is adjacent to Hammonds Plains in the east and south, Upper Tantallon in the south, Head of St. Margarets Bay and Mount Uniacke in the west, and Mount Uniacke and Upper Sackville in the north.

== History ==
Upper Hammonds Plains was originally established in 1815 as a settlement area for Black Refugees from the War of 1812 when a group of 500 refugees moved to the area immediately north of the then 34-year-old logging and farming community Hammonds Plains.

"As with most Blacks forced to live on the outskirts of more thriving areas, they were faced with great hardships. In 1821, 95 of these Black settlers left for Trinidad. Most, however stayed under horrible living conditions and numerous obstacles, rising above their circumstances to carve out an honest living for themselves." By 1970, Upper Hammonds Plains was an almost exclusively Black community with a population of 500.

"Land and water expropriation has been a major issue in the community since municipal and provincial governments began looking to the Upper Hammonds Plains area for land around 1974. This resulted in the expropriation of Pockwock Lake to supply water for the city of Halifax, the town of Bedford, and Halifax County. The expropriated land would house the Halifax regional water commission’s water treatment plant. The community was offered $100,000 for the land – much less than what it was actually worth. Moreover, although the water main lines passed through the community’s backyards, there was no offer of water service made to the community. In 1987 Rev. Willard Clayton raised the issue of the need for water service and compensation, citing that the community lost use of its sustainable resource of fishing, as well as recreational swimming and Sunday morning baptisms, among other things. Hammonds Plains is now connected the city’s water system."

== Community infrastructure ==
"Rev. John Burton (or 'Father Burton') was the first to provide pastoral services to the community. He established the Hammonds Plains Second Baptist Church in 1822. In 1832, the legendary Rev. Richard Preston (founder of the African United Baptist Association) established the Hammonds Plains Baptist Church. In 1839, the two churches joined - the unified church was referred to as Emmanuel Baptist Church." The current building housing Emmanuel Baptist Church was built in 1845 and has served the community continuously since that time, having undergone a significant expansion in 2005.

The Pockwock Lake reservoir is the primary water supply for Halifax. A water treatment plant and pipeline in the community are operated by Halifax Water, a commission of the Halifax Regional Municipality.

Madeline Symonds School is named after Upper Hammonds Plains resident Madeline Symonds, the first Black teacher to graduate from the Provincial Normal School in Truro.

The Upper Hammonds Plains Volunteer Fire Department is the first all-Black volunteer fire department in Canada, established in the 1960s.

== Geography ==
Upper Hammonds Plains is defined by Pockwock Lake which is the primary reservoir for Halifax.

Upper Hammonds Plains in Nova Scotia

== Schools ==
Schools which service residents of Upper Hammonds Plains include;

- Madeline Symonds Middle School
- Hammonds Plains Consolidated School
- West Bedford High School
