= Josef (given name) =

Josef is a variant of the male given name Joseph, notably used in Austria, the Czech Republic, Germany and Switzerland. The name also appears in Scandinavia. Notable people with the surname include:

== Arts ==
- Josef Abrhám (1939–2022), Czech actor
- Josef Albers (1888–1976), German artist
- Josef Bierbichler (born 1948), German actor and writer
- Josef Fares (born 1977), Swedish-Lebanese film director and video game designer
- Josef Frank (architect) (1885–1967), Austrian-Swedish architect and artist
- Josef Gočár (1880–1945), Czech architect
- Josef Hlinomaz (1914–1978), Czech actor
- Josef Hoffmann (1870–1956), Austrian architect and designer
- Josef Kemr (1922–1995), Czech actor
- Josef Kjellgren (1907–1948), Swedish writer
- Josef Krips (1902–1974), Austrian orchestral conductor
- Josef Lada (1887–1957), Czech painter, illustrator and writer
- Josef Müller (art collector) (1887–1977), Swiss art collector and curator
- Josef Müller-Brockmann (1914–1996), graphic designer
- Josef Felix Müller (born 1955), Swiss sculptor, graphic artist and painter
- Josef Václav Myslbek (1848–1922), Czech sculptor
- Josef Mysliveček (1737–1781), Czech composer
- Josef Schmid (composer) (1890–1969), American conductor and composer
- Josef Skřivan (1902–1942), Czech actor and director
- Josef Skupa (1892–1957), Czech puppeteer
- Josef Somr (1934–2022), Czech actor
- Josef von Sternberg (1894–1969), Austrian-American film director
- Josef Strauss (1827–1870), Austrian composer
- Josef Suk (composer) (1874–1935), Czech composer and violinist
- Josef Suk (violinist) (1929–2011), Czech violinist and conductor

== Sports ==
- Josef Augusta (ice hockey) (1946–2017), Czech ice hockey player and coach
- Josef Bican (1913–2001), Austrian-Czech footballer
- Josef Beránek (born 1969), Czech ice hockey player
- Josef Čtyřoký (1906–1985), Czech footballer
- Josef Doležal (1920–1999), Czech race walker
- Josef Dostál (canoeist) (born 1993), Czech sprint canoeist
- Josef Duchoslav (born 1967), Czech ice hockey player
- Josef Effenberger (1901–1983), Czech gymnast
- Josef Fahrenholtz (born 2001), American basketball player
- Josef Hladký (born 1962), Czech-German medley swimmer
- Josef Hügi (1930–1995), Swiss footballer
- Josef Hušbauer (born 1990), Czech footballer
- Josef Imbach (athlete) (1894–1964), Swiss sprinter
- Josef Jandač (born 1968), Czech ice hockey coach
- Josef Jungmann (fencer) (1888–1982), Czech fencer
- Josef Košťálek (1909–1971), Czech footballer
- Josef Kořenář (born 1998), Czech ice hockey player
- Josef Kratochvíl (footballer) (1905–1984), Czech footballer
- Josef Lontscharitsch (born 1970), Austrian road cyclist
- Josef Martínez (born 1993), Venezuelan footballer
- Josef Masopust (1931–2015), Czech footballer
- Josef Melichar (born 1979), Czech ice hockey player
- Josef Mikoláš (1938–2015), Czech ice hockey player
- Josef Müller (footballer) (1893–1984), German footballer
- Josef Newgarden (born 1990), American racing driver
- Josef Odložil (1938–1993), Czech middle-distance runner
- Josef Pešice (1950–2017), Czech football player and manager
- Josef Samael (born 1974), American professional wrestler
- Josef Schmid (athlete) (born 1953), German middle-distance runner
- Josef Schneider (footballer) (1901–?), Austrian football player and manager
- Josef Schneider (rower) (1891–1966), Swiss rower
- Josef Schneider (skier) (born 1957), German skier
- Josef Silný (1902–1981), Czech footballer
- Josef Šural (1990–2019), Czech footballer
- Josef Vašíček (1980–2011), Czech ice hockey player
- Josef Vojta (1935–2023), Czech footballer
- Sepp Zeilbauer (born Josef Zeilbauer, 1952), Austrian decathlete

== Other ==
- Josef Ludwig von Armansperg (1787–1853), Bavarian government minister, Regent and Prime Minister of Greece
- Josef Augusta (paleontologist) (1903–1968), Czech paleontologist and geologist
- Josef Bühler (1904–1948), German Nazi government official executed for crimes against humanity
- Josef Dietrich (1892–1966), German World War II Waffen-SS general and war criminal
- Josef Dobrovský (1753–1829), Czech philologist and historian
- Josef Ertl (1925–2000), German politician
- Josef Frank (politician) (1885–1967), Czech politician
- Josef Fritzl (born 1935), Austrian sex offender
- Josef Grünwidl (born 1963), Austrian archbishop
- Josef Hoop (1895–1959), Prime Minister of Liechtenstein
- Josef Imbach (theologian) (born 1945), Swiss theologian
- Josef Ježek (1884–1969), Czech politician
- Josef Jungmann (1773–1847), Czech linguist and poet
- Josef Jungmann (theologian) (1830–1885), German-Austrian theologian
- Josef Andreas Jungmann (1889–1975), Austrian Jesuit priest and reformer
- Josef Kareis (1837–1913), Austrian electrical engineer and politician
- Josef Klaus (1910–2001), Austrian politician
- Josef Kleindienst (born 1963), Austrian property developer
- Josef Kramer (1906–1945), German commandant of Bergen-Belsen concentration camp executed for war crimes
- Josef Albert Meisinger (1899–1947), German Nazi SS and Gestapo officer executed for war crimes
- Josef Mengele (1911–1979), German World War II SS officer, physician and war criminal
- Josef Müller (entomologist) (1880–1964), Croatian entomologist
- Josef Müller (politician) (1898–1979), German politician
- Josef Oberhauser (1915–1979), German Nazi SS concentration camp commandant and Holocaust perpetrator
- Josef Schmid (flight surgeon) (born 1965), NASA flight surgeon
- Josef Schmid (theologian) (1883–1975), German Catholic theologian
- Josef Schneider Sr. (1840–1927), German electrical engineer
- Josef Schütz (1921–2023), Lithuanian-German Nazi SS concentration camp guard
- Josef Schwammberger (1912–2004), Nazi SS forced labor camp commandant
- Josef Singer (1923–2009), Israeli aeronautic engineer
- Josef Meier Spatz, Canadian property developer
- Josef Wüst (1925–2003), Austrian journalist, editor-in-chief and publisher

== Fictional characters ==
- Josef Landau, fictional character in the book Refugee
- Josef K, fictional character in Franz Kafka's novel The Trial
- Josef (Vert) Wheeler, a character from various Hot Wheels media

== See also ==
- Jozef
