= Mickey MacDonald =

Canadian businessman (born 1952)

- Born: 1952 (age 73–74)
- Occupation: Entrepreneur
- Known for: Telecommunications, food retailing and the fitness industries

Mickey MacDonald (born 1952) is an entrepreneur in Halifax, Nova Scotia, Canada who has been involved in telecommunications, food retailing and the fitness industries.

== Businesses ==
=== Clearwater ===
The first time MacDonald got back to Halifax, he helped his brother Colin and Rick, and brother-in-law John Risley start up a fishery company called Clearwater.

=== DownEast Communications ===
MacDonald purchased the single telecommunications store located on the Bedford Highway that specialized in wireless communications in 1991 and grew it to 51 locations across Atlantic Canada. The company was sold to Aliant (now Bell Aliant) on October 1, 2004

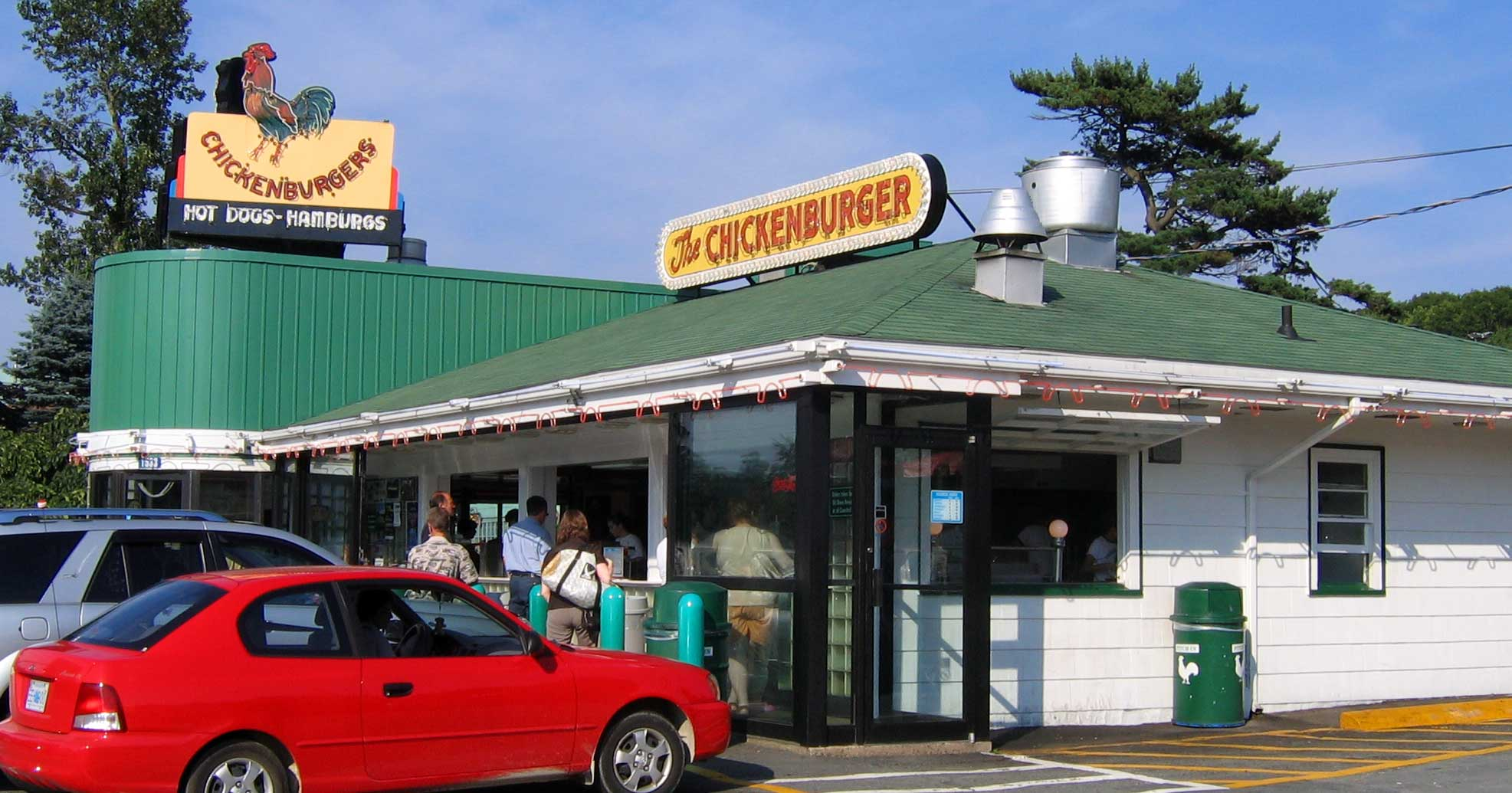
The Chickenburger restaurant

=== The Chickenburger ===
On March 19, 2007 MacDonald purchased The Chickenburger, a 1950s style diner located on the Bedford Highway, which is considered to be a Bedford, Nova Scotia landmark famous for its burgers that consist of boiled chicken on a hamburger bun.

=== Palooka’s Gym ===
In the spring of 2007, MacDonald founded Palooka's Gym, a fitness centre that focuses on its competitive boxing program in addition to general fitness in an old movie house on Göttingen Street in Downtown Halifax. On September 8, 2011 it was announced that Palooka's Gym on Göttingen St would be permanently ceasing operations by the end of the month, but there was also a location open on the Bedford highway.

== Charities ==
=== Bella Rose Arts Centre ===
MacDonald contributed $300,000 CAD to Theatre Halifax, a community theatre in Halifax West High School. To show appreciation for this donation, the theatre changed its name to the Bella Rose Arts Centre in honour of MacDonald's mother Bella and his daughter Rose.

== Personal life ==
MacDonald grew up one of seven children in Fairview, Halifax. He left school in grade nine and worked at odd jobs across Canada, spending some time homeless in Toronto, Ontario. While in Toronto he started boxing competitively. MacDonald later completed a GED. One of his brothers, Colin, is also a prominent Halifax area businessman while another, Rick, is a boxing trainer.
