= Josef Schmid =

Josef Schmid may refer to:

- Josef Schmid (athlete) (born 1953), German middle-distance runner
- Josef Schmid (composer) (1890–1969), American conductor, composer, and composition teacher
- Josef Schmid (flight surgeon) (born 1965), NASA flight surgeon
- Josef Schmid (theologian) (1883–1975), German Catholic theologian
- Joseph Schmid (1901–1956), Luftwaffe general
