= Josef Jungmann (disambiguation) =

Josef Jungmann (1773–1847) was a Czech linguist and poet.

Josef Jungmann may also refer to:

- Josef Jungmann (fencer) (1888–1982), Czech fencer
- Josef Jungmann (theologian) (1830–1885), German-Austrian theologian
- Josef Andreas Jungmann (1889–1975), Austrian Jesuit priest and liturgist

== See also ==
- Josef Jungmann Award
