= Halifax Regional Police =

Police department in Halifax, Canada

Coordinates: 44°38′58.24″N 63°34′50.10″W

- Motto: Leading and partnering in our community to serve and protect.

Agency overview
- Formed: October 28, 1864 (original); April 1, 1996 (current HRP)

Jurisdictional structure
- Legal jurisdiction: Halifax, Nova Scotia

Operational structure
- Overseen by Commission: Halifax Board of Police Commissioners
- Sworn members: 615
- Unsworn members: 321
- Elected officers responsible: The Honourable Mark Furey, Minister of Justice; Deputy Mayor Steven Craig, Board Chair
- Agency executive: Don Maclean, Chief of Police

Facilities
- Stations: 8

Website
- Official website

The Halifax Regional Police (HRP) is the urban municipal law enforcement agency of Halifax Regional Municipality.

== History ==
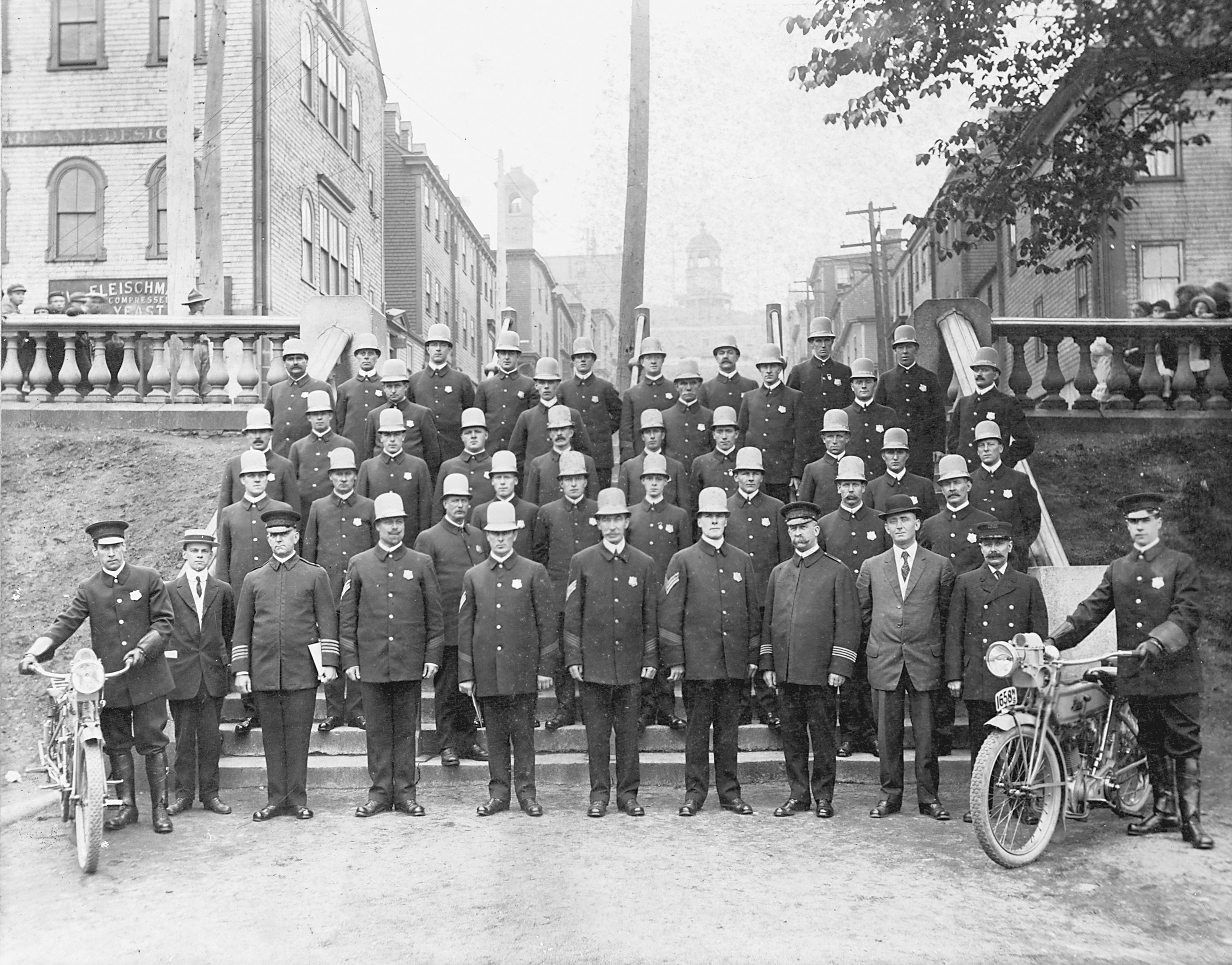
Halifax City Police on the Grand Parade, July 1914

The Halifax Police Department was officially formed on 28 October 1864, although a system of constables had been operated in an unofficial manner since the first days of settlement, on 18 July 1749. Each ship arriving in the port city of Halifax would appoint one member of the crew to act as a constable responsible for the actions of the crew and passengers on board. In January 1799, the "night patrol" was formed to address a number of break and enters that hit the area in the previous year.

July 1813, was marked by widespread rioting and the militia were called up to take over policing duties. They were discharged in February 1814, but quickly re-instated less than a month later when rioting resumed.

In October 1864 the day watch and night watch merged to form the Halifax Police Department under City Marshall Garrett Cotter. Six divisions were formed with five men assigned to each sergeant. Halifax got its first detective in 1873.

The Dartmouth Police Department was established in 1874 following the Town of Dartmouth's incorporation the previous year. The Dartmouth Police Department worked out of the Dartmouth Town Hall until the 1940s where it was moved to Wentworth Street. In the early 1990s, the Dartmouth force moved to a new headquarters at 21 Mount Hope Avenue. The Dartmouth Police Department had a number of "firsts" for Nova Scotia. Those include, first with winter and summer issued clothing, air conditioned cars, and dress uniforms. The force also was the first to have a K9 unit in the province as well as outfit its members with bullet proof vests.

The town of Bedford did not have its own police force until 1982. The Bedford Police Station was located in the current day Cascade Spa building on the Bedford Highway and later relocated to Sunnyside Mall.

With the 1st April 1996 creation of the Halifax Regional Municipality, the police forces of Halifax, Dartmouth and Bedford were dissolved and merged into the new Halifax Regional Police. Policing in the new municipality was split between the regional police covering the boundaries of the former cities of Halifax and Dartmouth and town of Bedford, while the RCMP covered suburban-and-rural areas in the remainder of the regional municipality.

== Structure ==
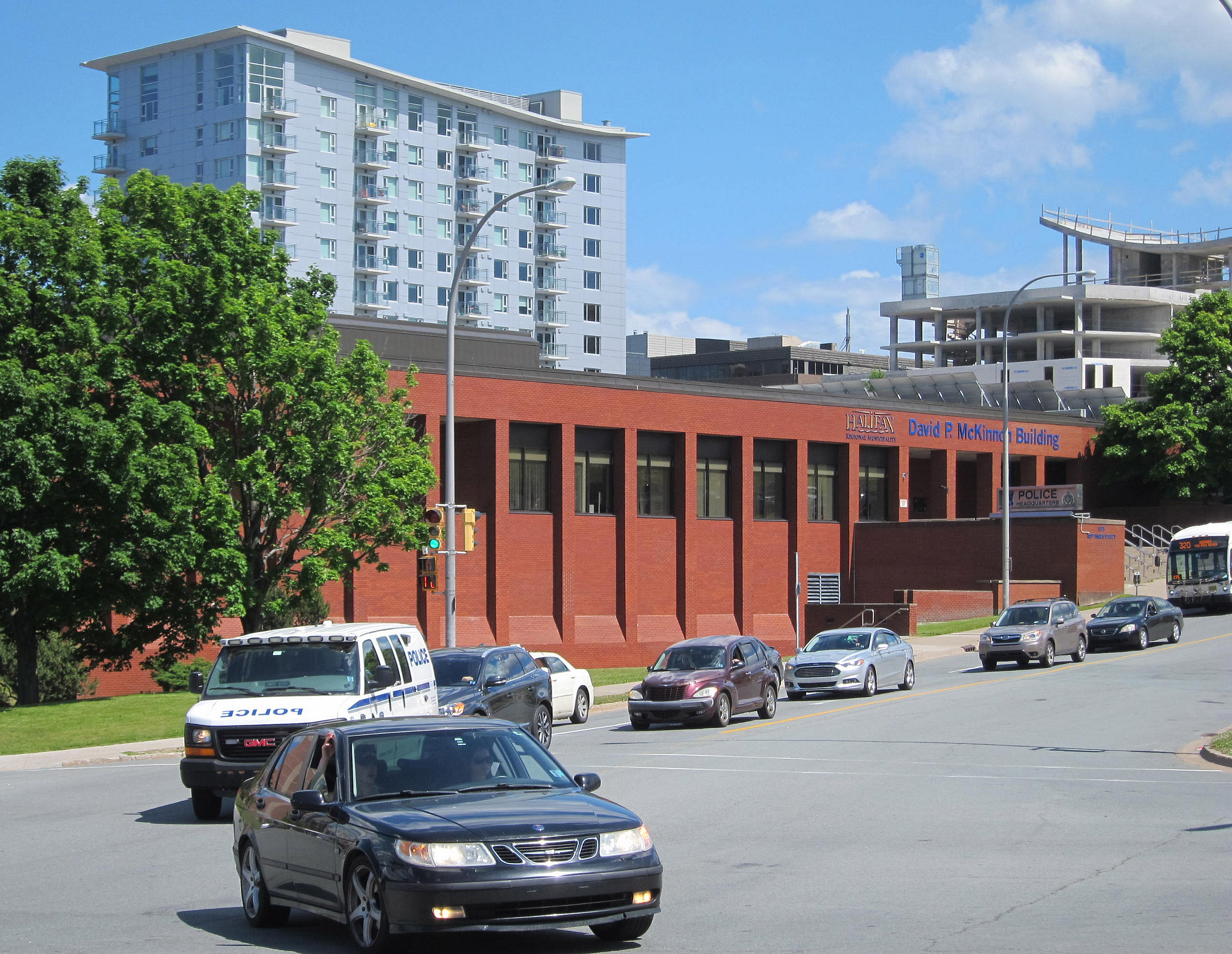
Police headquarters on Göttingen Street

The has a total strength of 531 sworn officers, 151 civilian staff, 170 crossing guards, nine K-9 dogs and two horses. It is headed by Don Maclean, chief of police. is also responsible for armed security and response at Halifax Stanfield International Airport. A household in the Halifax Regional Municipality typically pays around C$28.39 per month for police services.

=== Patrol Division ===
The patrol division is divided up into three divisional areas:

- Central - Peninsular Halifax
- East - Dartmouth
- West - Bedford to Sambro Loop

The Halifax Regional Police are responsible for approximately 273.57 square kilometres (105.63 square miles) of the urban area around Halifax Harbour as the Royal Canadian Mounted Police are responsible for the remaining 5,202 square kilometres (2,009 square miles) suburban-and-rural area of the regional municipality. Along with the Halifax Regional Police-and-the Royal Canadian Mounted Police, the Canadian Forces Military Police and the Canadian National Railway Police also operate within the municipality.

In addition to the visible patrol officers, the patrol division has several specialized units:

- Aviation Security unit
- Community Relations and Crime Prevention unit
- Emergency Response Team
- K-9 unit
- Mental Health Mobile Crisis Team
- Mounted unit
- Ports unit
- Public Safety unit
- Traffic unit

=== School Response Officers ===
Along with the Patrol Division and its support units, School Response Officers patrol Halifax Regional Centre for Education schools within the Halifax Regional Police service area. The objective of these constables are: to counsel-and-talk with students; to deliver crime-and-safety lessons to students, parents/guardians of students, and faculty; to be a liaison between the criminal justice system, the school, and the students; to investigate criminal offences relating to the school-and-its students; and to enhance school security-and-safety.

==== International policing ====
Three members made history in 1999. They were the first officers from a municipal force from Atlantic Canada to serve on a United Nations peacekeeping force in Kosovo. Since then, 17 other HRP officers have served on peacekeeping missions in Haiti, Kosovo, Sierra Leone, Sudan, and East Timor.
