= Schrörs =

Schrörs is a surname. Notable people with the surname include:

- Günter Schroers (born 1939), German Olympic rower
- Heinrich Schrörs (1852–1928), German Catholic church historian
