= Joseph Schmitt =

Joseph Schmitt may refer to:

- Joseph Schmitt (composer) (1734–1791), German/Dutch composer, conductor, music director, publisher, music theorist and pedagogue
- Joseph Schmitt (politician) (1882–1967), German politician
- Joseph Anton Schmitt (1883–1951), German intendant
- Joseph W. Schmitt (1916–2017), spacesuit technician for NASA

== See also ==
- Joseph Schmidt (disambiguation)
