= Bedford Place =

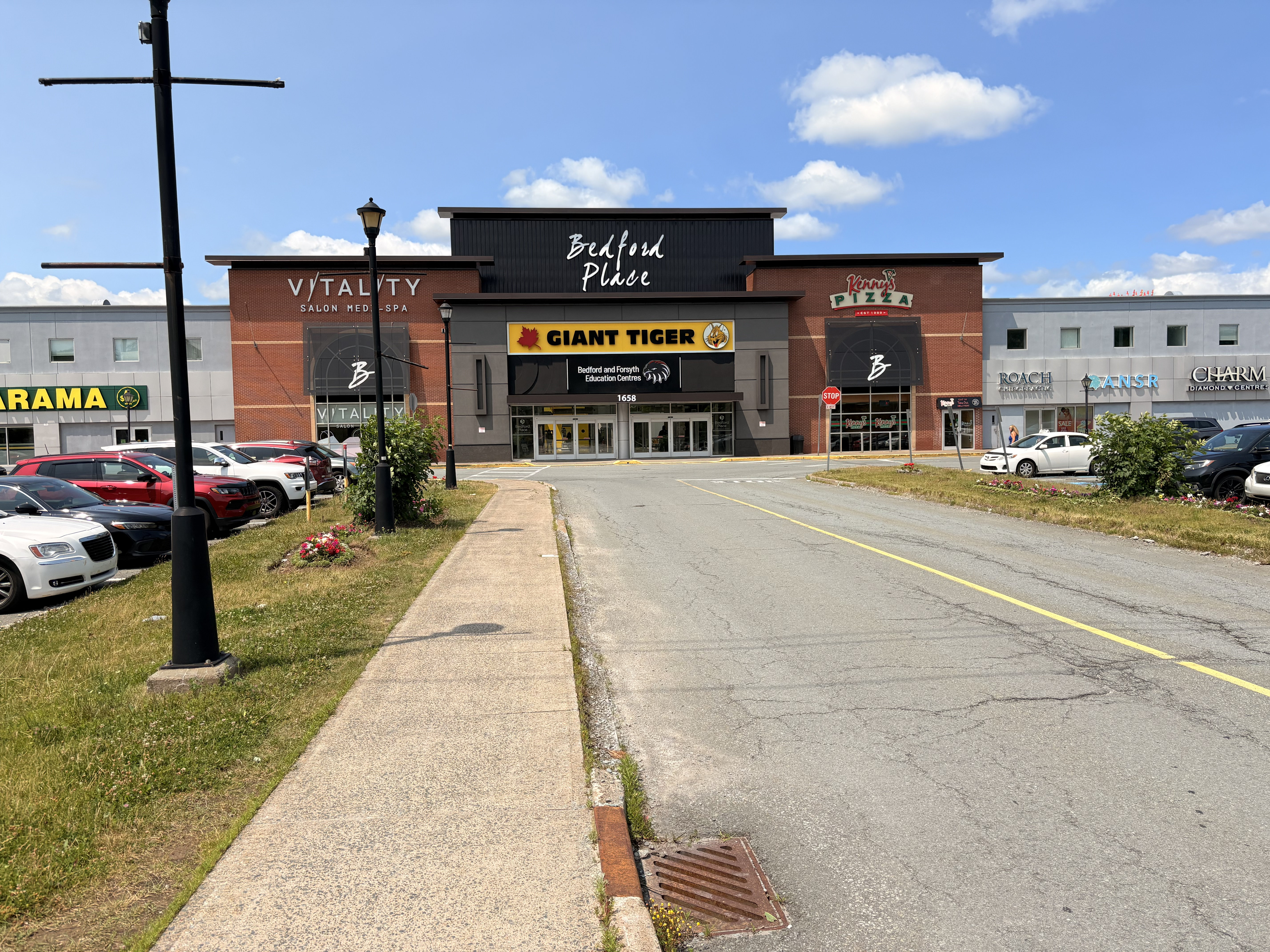
- Main entrance in July 2026
- Location: Bedford, Nova Scotia, Canada
- Coordinates: 44°44′10.82″N 63°39′25.20″W
- Address: 1658 Bedford Highway, Bedford, NS B4A 2B6
- Opened: September 1977
- Manager: Rester Realty
- Owner: Almadev
- Floor area: 295,066 sq. ft.
- Floors: 2
- Public transit: Halifax Transit
- Website: bedfordplacemall.com

Bedford Place is a 295,066 sq. ft. shopping mall in Bedford, Nova Scotia, Canada. It is one of two enclosed malls in direct proximity to each other. Sunnyside Mall is located directly across the street as the main competitor mall.

The property is located directly off the Bedford Highway and near the Nova Scotia Highway 102. There are two outparcel sections, including a plaza and a freestanding Real Atlantic Superstore.

== History ==
Bedford Place opened for business in September 1977 with two original anchor tenants, Dominion and Towers.

In 1985, Dominion left the Nova Scotian market after the chain was purchased by A&P. The store would be replaced with IGA along with several other locations in the province.

Towers would close in 1991 and was one of the only locations to be converted to Hudson's Bay, which opened on April 15. The store would later shutter on January 31, 1996, and was replaced with Zellers which moved from Sunnyside Mall, the mall was renovated during the move.

IGA would later close at the turn of the century and be replaced with a freestanding Real Atlantic Superstore, Winners later moved into the space.

Zellers closed on March 14, 2013 and was replaced with Target. The mall was renovated throughout 2013 and 2014.

Target closed in April 2015 was split into multiple tenants. This included Giant Tiger and multiple offices.

Rona closed in 2020 and was later replaced with Peavey Mart. It closed soon after in 2025, and will become FreshCo in late 2026.

During the early 2020s, the property was renamed from Bedford Place Mall to just Bedford Place after many tenant spaces were converted to commercial uses.

== Tenants ==
Anchor tenants

- Fit4Less (20,133 sq. ft.), opened in 2016.
- FreshCo (39,138 sq. ft.), set to open in late 2026.
- Giant Tiger (24,284 sq. ft.), opened on October 21, 2017.

Former notable tenants

- Peavey Mart, closed on April 13, 2025.
- Rona, closed in February 19, 2020.
- Target, closed on April 6, 2015.
- Winners, closed in 2011.
- Zellers, closed on March 14, 2013.

== See also ==
- List of shopping malls in Canada
- Sunnyside Mall
