= Joseph Schmidt (disambiguation) =

Joseph Schmidt (1904–1942) was an Austro-Hungarian tenor and actor.

Joseph, Josef or Joe Schmidt may also refer to:

== Sports ==
- Joe Schmidt (American football) (1932–2024), American football player and coach
- Joe Schmidt (soccer) (born 1998), American soccer player
- Joe Schmidt (rugby union) (born 1965), New Zealand rugby union coach
- Joe Schmidt (ice hockey) (1926–2000), Canadian ice hockey player
- Josef Schmidt (wrestler), Austrian Olympic wrestler

== Others ==
- Josef Schmidt (general) (1893–1943), German army general
- Josef Friedrich Schmidt (1871–1948), German board game inventor
- Joseph Hermann Schmidt (1804–1852), professor of obstetrics
- Joseph Schmidt (1904–1942), Austo-Hungarian and Romanian singer
- Joseph Schmidt, founder of Joseph Schmidt Confections, a chocolatier based in San Francisco, US

== See also ==
- Józef Szmidt (1935–2024), Polish athlete and former triple jump world record holder
- Joseph Schmid (1901–1956), German air force general
- Josef Schmid (disambiguation)
