= Frieda Schmitt-Lermann =

German composer and pianist

Frieda Schmitt-Lermann (born 24 May 1885) was a German composer and pianist who wrote music for orchestra, television, theatre and voice.

== Life ==
Schmitt-Lermann was born in Würzburg. She studied piano privately in Augsburg, then studied composition in Munich with Josef Schmid. Little is known about Schmitt-Lermann’s personal life.

Schmitt-Lermann’s Kompositionen fuer Violine und Klavier was recorded commercially on LP KASKA 1 BLN 30. Her music was published by Boehm & Sohn and Otto Halbreiter. Her compositions included:

== Chamber ==
- Kompositionen fuer Violine und Klavier

== Orchestra ==
- Allerseelen Symphonic Poem
- Indische Maerchen Symphonic Poem
- Serenade

== Theatre ==
- Das Lied von der Glocke (text by Friedrich Schiller)
- music for television

== Vocal ==
- Das Lied von der Glocke (choir and piano; text by Friedrich Schiller)
- Deutsche Schulmesse (two voices and organ)
- Drei Lieder
- Graduale fuer Mariae Empfangnis (choir and organ)
- “Liebeslied”
- “Lied vor de Trauung”
- Mass in F
- Offertorium fuer Christi Himmelfahrt (choir and orchestra)
- Songs
- “Vor der Trennung: wenn ich mit Menschen und mit Engelzungen”
