= Heinrich Schrörs =

German Catholic church historian

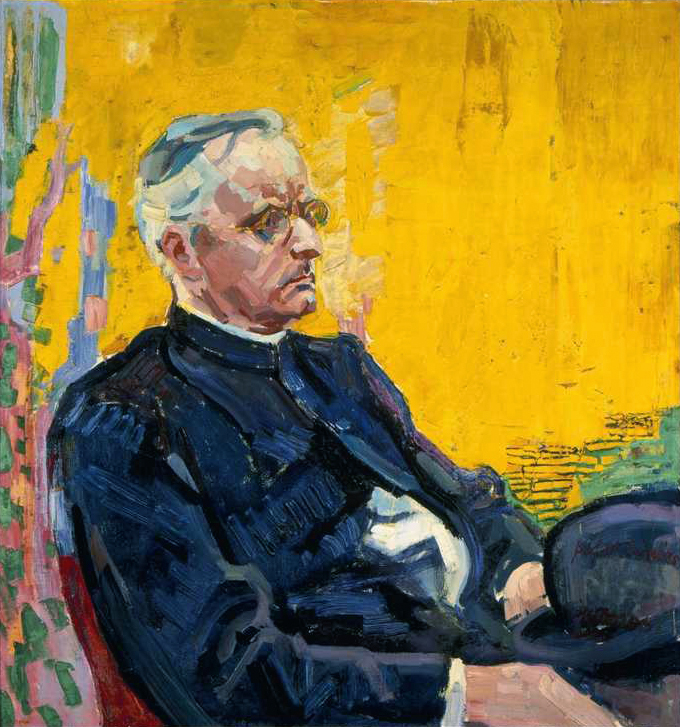
Johann Heinrich Schrörs (1852-1928) (Jan Toorop, 1911)

Johann Heinrich Schrörs (26 November 1852 in Krefeld – 11 June 1928 in Bonn) was a German Catholic church historian.

== Biography ==
He studied theology in Bonn, Würzburg and Innsbruck, where he was a student of Josef Jungmann (1830–1885). In 1877 he was ordained as priest in Innsbruck, and in 1885 became a professor of canon law at Freiburg im Breisgau. During the following year, with encouragement from Friedrich Althoff (1839–1908), he attained the chair of church history at the University of Bonn. At Bonn he served as university dean on five occasions (1891/92, 1900/01, 1902/03, 1906/07, 1914/15).

In 1887 he founded one of the first church history seminars in Germany, also building a well-equipped Seminarbibliothek (seminary library that was destroyed during World War II). Schrörs was devoted to higher education policy issues, especially in regards to his insistence on the principle of scientific education for theologians. His views on education led to years of open conflict with the Archdiocese of Cologne.

== Written works ==
- Hinkmar, Erzbischof von Reims, two editions (1884) -- Hincmar, archbishop of Reims.
- Kirche und Wissenschaft. Zustände an einer katholisch-theologischen Fakultät. Eine Denkschrift, Bonn (1907) -- Religion and science. Conditions at a Catholic theological faculty.
- Konstantins des Grossen Kreuzerscheinung (1913),-- Constantine the Great's cross appearance.
- Die kölner Erzbischofswahl nach Geissels Tode (1864–1865); (1914) -- book on the Archbishop of Cologne, Johannes von Geissel.
- Deutscher und französischer Katholizismus in den letzten Jahrzehnten (1917) -- German and French Catholicism in recent decades.
- Der Krieg und der Katholizismus, Kempten (1915) -- The war and Catholicism.
- Das christliche Gewissen im Weltkriege, Freiburg (1916) -- The Christian conscience in World War I.
- Die Kölner Wirren (1837). Studien zu ihrer Geschichte, Berlin and Bonn (1927) -- The turmoil of Cologne (1837). Studies on its history.

== Bibliography ==
- Gregor Klapczynski, Katholischer Historismus? Zum historischen Denken in der deutschsprachigen Kirchengeschichte um 1900. Heinrich Schrörs - Albert Ehrhard - Joseph Schnitzer (Münchener kirchenhistorische Studien. Neue Folge 2), Stuttgart: Kohlhammer, 2013, ISBN 978-3-17-023426-0.
