= Wadih Fares =

Canadian property developer

Wadih M. Fares CM
- Born: 13 July 1956 (age 69); Diman, Lebanon
- Education: Dalhousie University (diploma); Technical University of Nova Scotia (BEng)
- Occupations: Property developer; engineer
- Known for: Founder of WM Fares Group
- Children: 3

Honorary Consul of Lebanon for the Maritimes
- Incumbent
- Assumed office 1995

Wadih M. Fares CM (born 13 July 1956) is a Canadian property developer and engineer from Nova Scotia. Born in Lebanon, he is the founder and president of WM Fares Group, established in 1983. He serves as the Honorary Consul of Lebanon for the Maritimes.

== Early life and education ==
Wadih Fares was born in the village of Diman in northern Lebanon on 13 July 1956, to parents Georgette and Maurice Fares. His father ran an asphalt plant and built roads and bridges. Fares attended a private high school that provided him an international baccalaureate, and with a high academic performance he was accepted to attend the national university in Beirut. His education was cut short by the outbreak of the Lebanese Civil War, when he was conscripted into military service. After three months of deployment, Fares returned home following a night of heavy bombardment, and his mother insisted that he leave Lebanon and go to Canada. He obtained permission to leave from an army general and travelled to Paris, and from there across the Atlantic to Halifax.

Arriving in Canada in 1976 at the age of 18, Fares spoke Arabic and French but no English. He enrolled as a foreign arrival at Dalhousie University and began studying engineering, but encountered great difficulty due to his lack of English. He pushed through with the assistance of dictionaries and his friends in Halifax's Lebanese community, eventually learning the language. Fares graduated from Dalhousie with a diploma in engineering, and the Technical University of Nova Scotia with a Bachelor of Engineering. After completing his education, he took a position with Irving's precast concrete division in Bedford and Saint John, purchased a house, and married his wife, Cathy. He remained at Irving until the age of 26, when he was let go from the company after visiting his parents in Lebanon despite his request for vacation time being denied.

== Career ==
=== WM Fares Group ===
Not long after leaving Irving, Fares received his first commission to design a single-family home for a friend. Satisfied with his work, the same friend then commissioned him to design a 12-unit apartment building. After word of his services began to spread, he established WM Fares Group in 1983 and hired a secretary. Soon after, the company grew to include a part-time accountant and a draftsperson. WM Fares Group continued to expand over the following years, situating itself as a well-known development company in the Halifax area. Now with established connections in the industry, Fares began his first independent development project with a Halifax townhouse, purchasing the land following an investment from a relative. Over the following decades, WM Fares Group designed and built a wide range of buildings that transformed the skyline of Halifax, while also completing projects across the Maritime provinces, Ontario, and Alberta. Two of Fares' three children joined the business: his daughter Zana Fares-Choueiri, an engineer, joined WM Fares Group in 2006 and became head of their construction operations. His son Maurice Fares is the Chief Executive Officer (CEO) of the company.

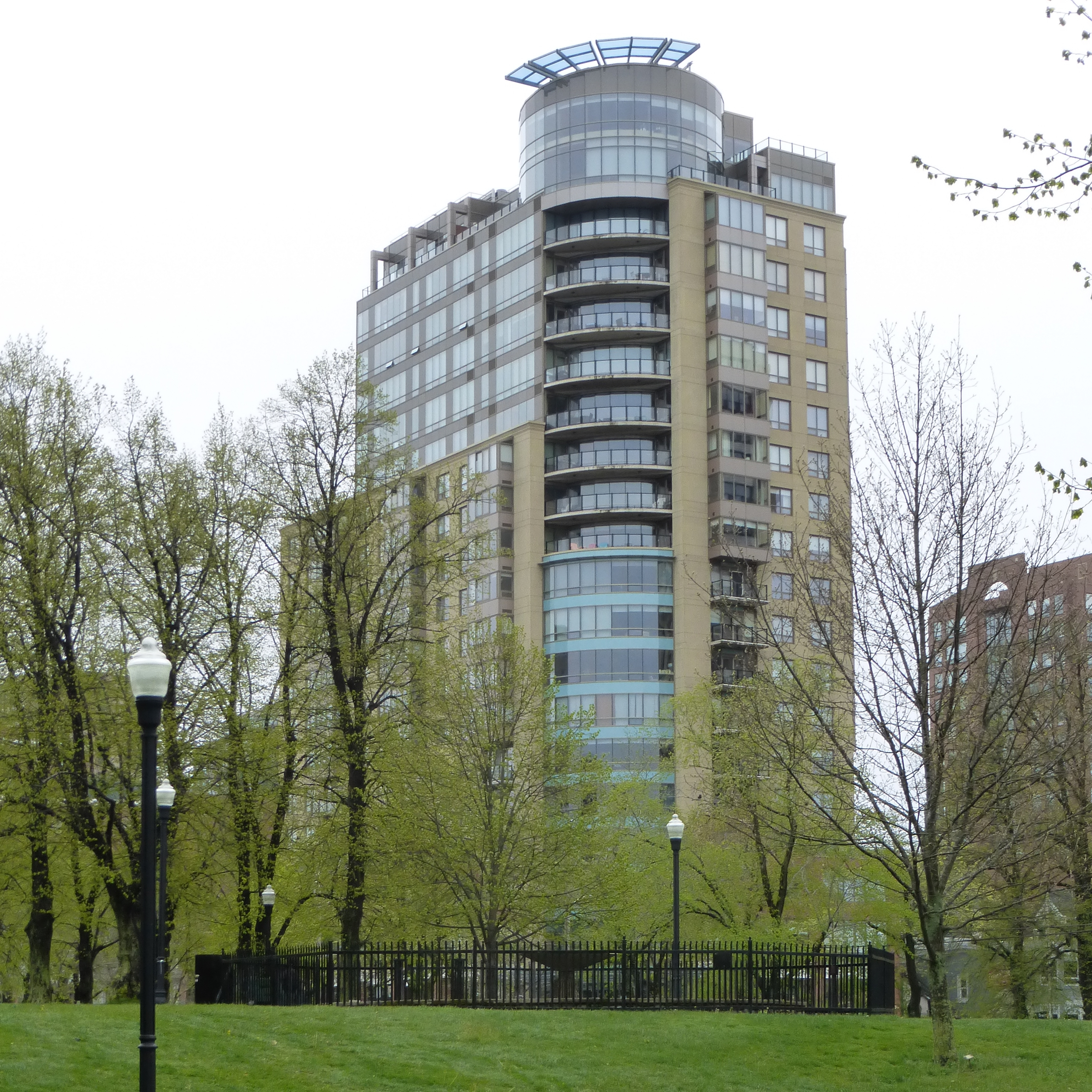
The Trillium is a $40-million high-rise condominium designed and built by WM Fares Group

WM Fares Group is perhaps best known for the Trillium, a $40-million high-rise condominium in downtown Halifax which was the first skyscraper erected in the downtown area in 25 years. The project began in 2008 and was completed in 2012, following which it was awarded a Lieutenant Governor's Award of Excellence in Engineering. By 2021, WM Fares Group had about 50 employees, owned 1,200 apartment units, and was designing over $1-billion in construction projects at once.

=== Honorary consulship ===
Fares has served as the Honorary Consul of Lebanon for the Maritimes since 1995, and is considered a leader in the Lebanese-Canadian community. During the 2006 Lebanon War, he criticized the Canadian government for failing to call for a ceasefire, accusing them of going back on Canada's traditional approach to Middle Eastern conflicts and giving a "green-light" to Israel to continue its campaign against Hezbollah.

=== Boards and committees ===
In 2014, Premier Stephen McNeil appointed Fares as national chairman of Nova Scotia's immigration advisory council. He has also served as chair of the board of directors of the Halifax International Airport Authority, chairman of Dalhousie University's Capital Projects and Facilities Committee, a member of the Dalhousie University board of governors, and a member of the Advisory Committee to the Minister for Housing Nova Scotia. He is a founder and honorary member of the Canadian Lebanese Chamber of Commerce and Industry.

As chairman and director of the Pier 21 Society in Halifax, Fares and his board oversaw the designation of the historic Pier 21 as a National Historic Site of Canada. He has also served as a director of the Waterfront Development Corporation, a provincial Crown corporation established in 1976 to manage waterfront properties in Halifax, Dartmouth, and Bedford.

== Political donations ==
During the 2012 Halifax municipal election, Fares and his wife donated $3,800 to the campaigns of five councillors and the mayor. In 2024 Halifax municipal election, Fares donated $2,500 to the mayoral campaign of Andy Fillmore. His son Maurice also donated to Fillmore's campaign.

The National Post listed Fares among Nova Scotia's top political donors in 2020, having made 12 donations to the three major parties: $7,691.24 to the Progressive Conservatives, $7,504 to the Liberals, and $2,873.12 to the NDP.

== Philanthropy ==
Fares carries out his charitable endeavours through the WM Fares Family Foundation. In 2022, the foundation donated $500,000 to support cancer-fighting technology at the Queen Elizabeth II Health Sciences Centre in Halifax.

== Awards and honours ==
Fares has been the recipient of a wide variety of awards and distinctions. In 2002, he was awarded a Queen Elizabeth II Golden Jubilee Medal. In 2008, he was inducted into the Nova Scotia Business Hall of Fame. The following year, he was awarded an honorary Doctor of Commerce by Saint Mary's University, and designated as a Fellow of Engineers Canada. Atlantic Business Magazine named Fares their CEO of the Year for 2011, and in 2012 the Halifax Chamber of Commerce recognized him as their Business Person of the Year. He was invested as a Member of the Order of Canada on 23 November 2012, and received a Queen Elizabeth II Diamond Jubilee Medal the same year. In 2014, Fares received a Humanitarian Award from the Canadian Red Cross. He was awarded a King Charles III Coronation Medal in 2025 by nomination from Lena Diab. Fares is a member of the Order of St. Gregory, conferred to him by Pope Benedict XVI.

== See also ==
- Jim Spatz, another Nova Scotian property developer
