= Bella Rose Arts Centre =

Halifax performing arts centre

- Interactive map of Bella Rose Arts Centre
- Former names: TheatreHalifax
- Location: 283 Thomas Raddall Drive; Halifax West High School; Halifax, Nova Scotia, Canada
- Coordinates: 44°39′24.59″N 63°39′51.69″W
- Owner: Bella Rose Arts Centre Society
- Seating type: Reserved/General
- Capacity: 600
- Type: Indoor theatre

Construction
- Groundbreaking: February 2007; 19 years ago
- Built: June 2007; 19 years ago
- Opened: October 2007; 19 years ago

Website
- http://bellaroseartscentre.com

The Bella Rose Arts Centre is a community-based proscenium theatre performing arts centre located inside of Halifax West High School in the Clayton Park neighbourhood of the Halifax Regional Municipality, Nova Scotia. The 604 seat, professional grade, multi-purpose theatre has the capacity to handle almost any type of event from music and dance shows, to theatrical productions, and festivals, cultural and community events. It functions primarily as a rental venue and produces an annual festival for young audiences in August.

== Foundation ==
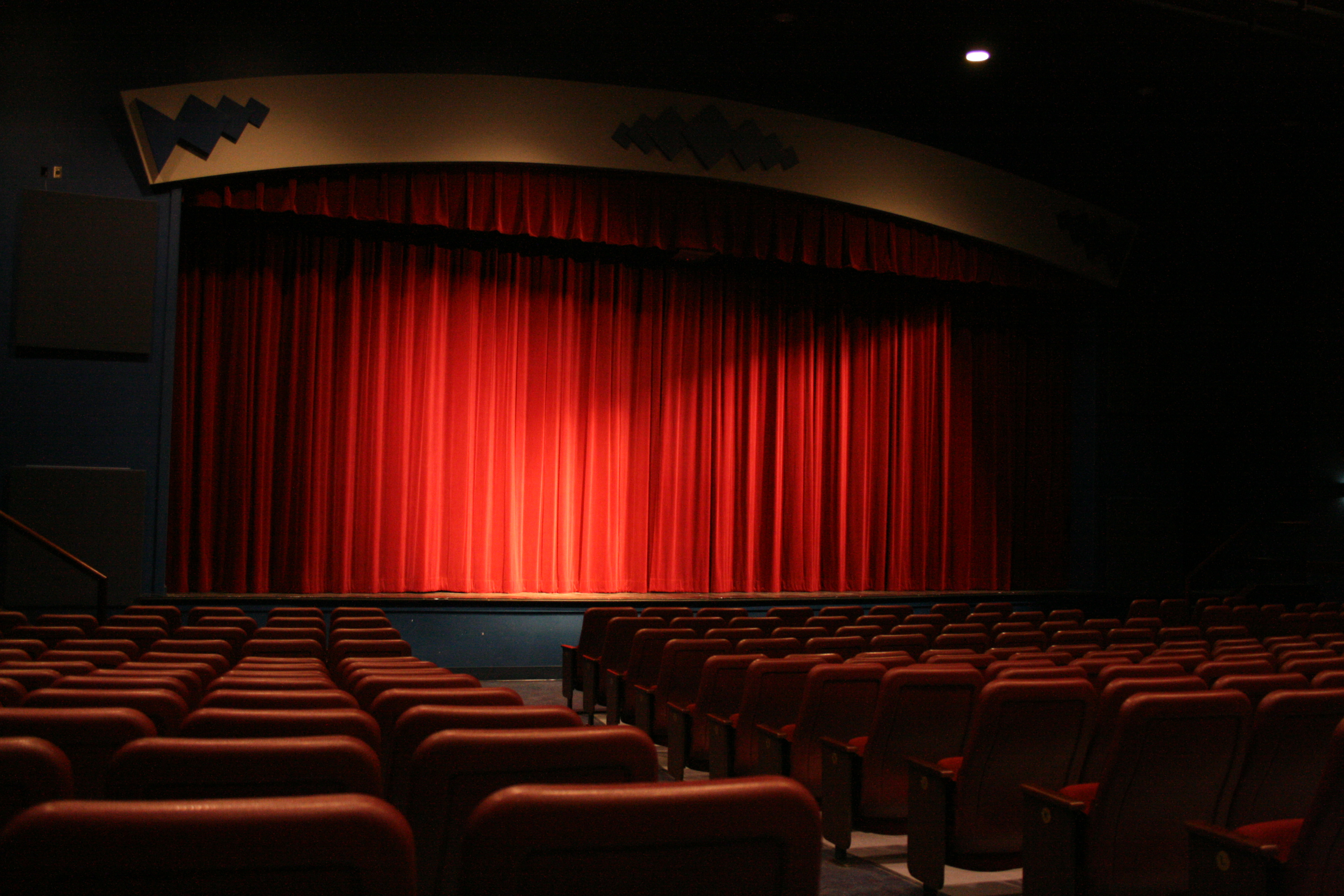
Bella Rose Arts Centre's stage as seen from the left hand side of the orchestra

The idea of the theatre was founded during the planning process of the new Halifax West High School after the old Halifax West High School became condemned due to toxic mould contamination in July 2000.

Though the old Halifax West High School did not have a theatre or auditorium—having just a gymnasium with a stage in it—the communities of Clayton Park and surrounding areas fought for a theatre during the planning process of the new school. The Nova Scotia Department of Education would however not fund a theatre seeing it as an unnecessary add-on to an already expensive new High School.

After extensive of planning and community consultation it was decided that if there was going to be a theatre inside of the new Halifax West High School that the money for it would have to come from sources other than the government. The Halifax West Community Theatre Association was then founded to ensure that a theatre would be included in the overall plans for the new Halifax West High School.

The Halifax Regional School Board turned over the old Halifax West High School that was located on Dutch Village Road over to the Halifax Regional Municipality who then demolished the building sold the lot to a local developer for an undisclosed amount. Of that undisclosed amount approximately $300 000 CAD was then donated to the Halifax West Community Theatre Association so that an empty shell could be included in the High School's initial construction that would one day hold the theatre after fundraising was complete.

After a decade in operation the Bella Rose Arts Centre Society undertook a strategic decision to appoint an executive director to lead the organization's continued development, strengthen it's operational and financial sustainability, and guide it's future growth and programming.

== Fundraising ==
Once the new Halifax West High School was completed, the Halifax West Community Theatre Association began fundraising for the new theatre calling it Theatre Halifax. The centre remained known as Theatre Halifax until February 12, 2007, when it was announced that Mickey MacDonald, a local entrepreneur and businessman pledged to donate $300,000.00 CAD towards the theatre. The theatre was then renamed the Bella Rose Arts Centre in honour of his mother, Bella MacDonald and his daughter, Bella Rose MacDonald. The Halifax West Theatre Association was also later renamed to the Bella Rose Arts Centre Society to reflect this generous donation.

The theatre's fundraising efforts include; general donations from individuals, corporations and local governments, holding raffles and selling advertising space on tickets, ticket envelopes, and on the centre's website.

The most notable fundraising campaign is the Name-A-Seat campaign which allows anyone to purchase an inscribed plate in one of the theatre's 600 seats.

In 2023 under new direction of the ED the theater received a $300,000.00 CAD grant for new equipment through the Canadian Community Revitalization Fund (CCRF) which was created in 2021 to help communities recover from the effects of COVID-19. They also received $25,000 CAD from the Halifax Regional Municipality for the project leading to a $450,000 technical overhaul project.

The Bella Rose Arts Centre Society is a Canadian registered charity.

== Construction ==
The concrete shell that was put in place for the theatre was fairly limited; the original plan for the theatre only included 503 orchestra seats, no balcony, and no catwalks. The Halifax West Community Theatre Association, during the final planning stages, decided to put in an additional 97-seat balcony and two catwalks. This required some slight modifications to the exterior of the theatre shell on the second floor of the high school to add access to these areas.

After most of the fundraising efforts were completed, construction on the theatre started in February 2007 and was completed in June 2007.

== Amenities ==
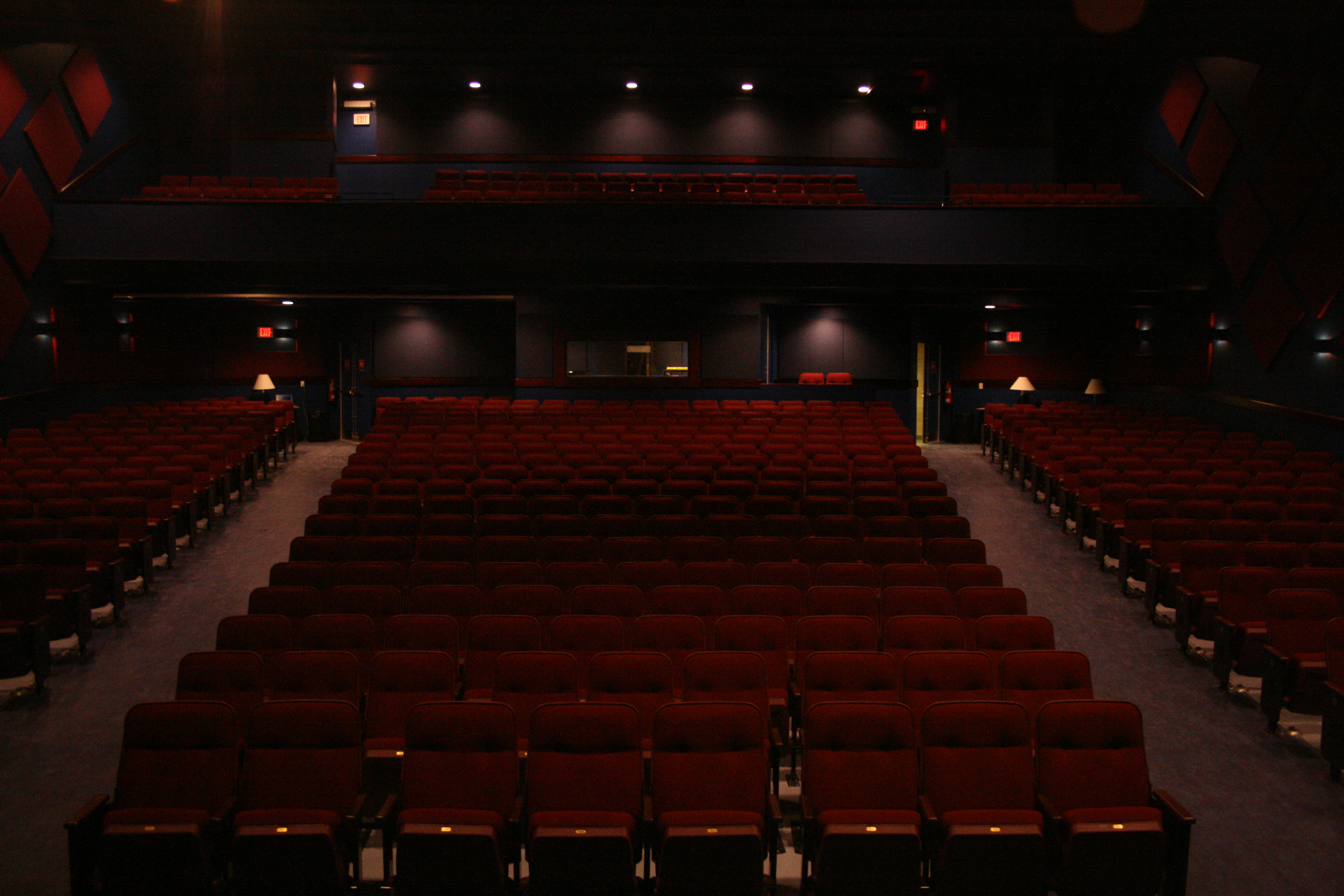
Bella Rose Arts Centre's house as seen from downstage centre pre 2023

- The Bella Rose Arts Centre is a proscenium theatre with a stage that has a performance space that is 34 feet wide and 23 feet deep. The stage has a sprung, professional grade dance floor.
- There is wing space on both sides of the stage.
- Upgrades include a mid stage draw to create a more intimate stage or accommodate upstage set changes.
- There are 501 seats in the orchestra and 97 seats in the balcony for a total of 598 fixed seats.
- There are 6 accessibility spots available for wheelchair users.
- The venue features state of the art audio, lighting and video systems.

== Building Community ==
The Bella Rose Arts Centre reinvests in the community through three key initiatives: Education Through Arts Grants, the Creative Access Program, and the School Audience Series. These programs support the development of local and regional performing artists, improve access to professional arts facilities, and provide educational opportunities for young audiences.

The Education ThroughArts Grants, the Creative Access Program, and the School Audience Series. These programs support the development of local and regional performing artists, improve access to professional arts facilities, and provide educational opportunities for young audiences.

The Education Through Arts Grants support artists in developing performing arts content for educational audiences. The Creative Access Program provides artists and arts organizations with access to rehearsal and performance space to support the creation and presentation of new work. The School Audience Series connects students with professional live performances at no cost, reducing financial barriers to arts education and encouraging engagement with the performing arts.

Together, these initiatives reflect the Centre's nonprofit mandate by directing resources toward artistic development, arts education, and greater community access to live performance.

The Bella Rose Arts Centre maintains a close relationship with Halifax West High School, within which the Centre is located, supporting opportunities for students to engage with the performing arts and gain experience in a professional theatre environment. Through collaboration with the school, the Centre contributes to arts education, student learning, and community engagement, while providing opportunities for students to develop technical, creative, and practical skills related to live performance and theatre operations. This relationship reflects the Centre’s role as both a community arts venue and a resource for arts education and experiential learning.

== Notable events and performances ==
- Brooks Diamond Productions - DRUM! (October 2008)
- 2008 Halifax Regional Municipality Swearing In Ceremony (November 2008)
- Premier Rodney MacDonald - Ceilidh for Kids (November 2010)
- Ballet Jörgen Canada - Original Dance (April 2009)
- Halifax Theatre for Young People - The Gravesavers (May 2009)
- Halifax West High School - How to Succeed in Business Without Really Trying (May 2009)
- So You Think You Can Dance Canada - Season 3 - Halifax Auditions (March 2010)
- TV with TV's Jonathan Torrens - TV Mystery Shows (April 2010)
- Halifax Theatre for Young People - Merlin (April 2010)
- Halifax West High School - A Chorus Line (May 2010)
- Halifax Boys' Honour Choir with special guests Men of the Deeps - Mining the Memories (March 2011)
- Dr. Horrible's Sing-Along Blog On Stage (May 2011)
- The Wiggles (September 2019)
- Lebanese International Film Festival (Nov 2018-2023)
- A Christmas Dollhouse (Dec 2019)
- Prelude to a Kiss (Feb 2022)
- Rara Ranbir (December 2022)
- Tom Jackson ( December 2022)
- Snowed In Comedy Tour (February 2023)
- Coronation Street - The Honeymooners (June 2023)
- Foil Arms and Hog (July 2023)
- Steve Hoffsteader (Aug 2023)
- Jaspreet Singh (October 2023)
- Ki Farak Painda Hi (Nov 2023)
- Aries Spears (April 2024 & May 2025)
- Mythos Ragnarock (July 2024)
- Coronation Street Live, Beth + Nina (July 2024)
- Off the Rock - Great Big Sea Tribute (July 2024)
- Bianca Del Rio (August 2024)
- Aaron Goodvin (November 2024)
- Randy Feltface (November 2024)
- Alex MacKenzie - Happy Camper Tour (January 2025)
- Holly Carr's Light in the Forest (February 2025)
- The Eminem Show - A Real Slim Shady Tribute (February 2025)
- Samay Raina (March 2025)
- Jon Bryant (April 2025)
- Johnny Cash Songbook (June 2025)
- Abhishek Upmanyu (June 2025)
- Harland Williams (June 2025)
- Pritish Narula (June 2025)
- Maheep Singh (August 2025)
- Harsh Gujral (September 2025)
- Hisham Abbas (October 2025)
- Savio Joseph (October 2025)
- Zuppa's Movements (November 2025)
- Irish Descendants (December 2026)
- Meaghan Smith (December 2025)
- Doktor Kaboom! Under Pressure (February 2026)
- Rahul Dua (February 2026)
- Hello Again (February 2026)
- Mike Lynch (March 2026)
- Ballet West Montreal - Ella (April 2026)
- Anmol Magic (May 2026)
- Anubhav Singh Bassi (June 2026)
- Italian Opera Gala (July 2026)
- Junhee Into the Ocean Tour (July 2026)
- BRAVO! Festival for Young Audiences (August 2026)
- Razzmatazz for Kids - Bravo! Festival for Young Audiences (August 2026)
- Michael Harrison Ventastic - Bravo! Festival for Young Audiences (August 2026)
- The Skeleton Dance - Bravo! Festival for Young Audiences (August 2026)
- InesS Circus, Bird Watch - Bravo! Festival for Young Audiences (August 2026)
- Holly Carr's The Comfort Tree - Bravo! Festival for Young Audiences (August 2026)
- Aakash Gupta Tour (September 2026)
- Owen Mac Live in Concert (September 2026)
- Outerbridge Magic, Mysteries of the Keyhole House (October 2026)
- Ridge Ft. The Fugitives (November 2026)
- Ivan Decker Middle Child (November 2026)
- The Irish Descendants (December 2026)
- Brett Kissel The Side You've Never Seen Holiday Tour (December 2026)
