= Jim Spatz =

Canadian property developer

Jim Spatz CM
- Born: Josef Meier Spatz; Munich, Germany
- Education: Doctor of Medicine
- Occupation: Property developer
- Awards: Queen Elizabeth II Diamond Jubilee Medal (2013); Order of Canada (2023)

Josef Meier "Jim" Spatz CM is a Canadian property developer from Halifax, Nova Scotia. Born in Munich, he immigrated to Halifax as a child where his father ran a grocery store business and later founded the real estate company Southwest Properties. After his father died in 2001, Spatz took control of the company and oversaw numerous notable developments in Halifax. Spatz has been the recipient of various awards and honours in recognition of his work and charitable endeavours, among them the Queen Elizabeth II Diamond Jubilee Medal in 2013 and the Order of Canada in 2023.

== Early life and education ==
Jim Spatz was born in Munich, Germany, to parents Simon and Riva Spatz. His parents were Holocaust survivors, and immigrated to Halifax in 1950 when he was 11 months old, arriving through Pier 21. Simon ran a grocery store business with his brother-in-law before purchasing his own store on Morris Street known as the Southend Market. He entered the real estate business when he purchased multiple houses adjacent to the market, and by the 1960s he sold his grocery store and began to focus primarily on property development, founding Southwest Properties. By 1988, the company was managing 700 to 800 apartment units under Simon's leadership.

Jim Spatz graduated with a Doctor of Medicine in 1974 and practiced family and emergency medicine for 13 years, including time spent as the acting chief of the emergency department at a Montreal hospital. In 1987, he returned to Halifax to join Southwest Properties, eventually assuming control of the company when his father died in 2001.

== Career ==
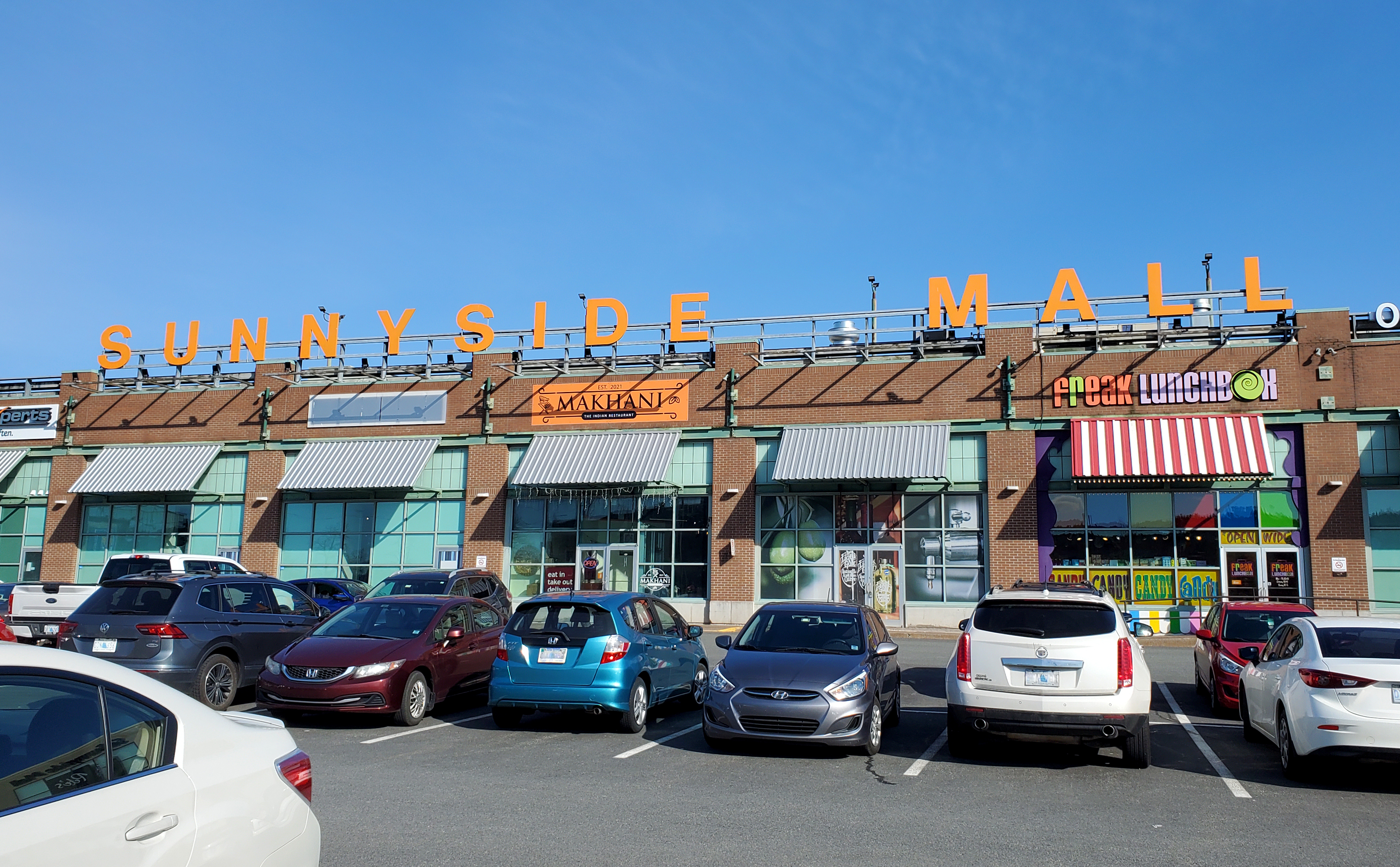
Spatz and his father oversaw a $20 million redevelopment of the Sunnyside Mall in 1989

As a property developer, Spatz has been involved with numerous notable projects in Halifax. Early developments with his father included The Terrace, a 6-storey apartment building which had just begun construction upon his arrival in Halifax in 1987, and a CAD$20 million redevelopment of the Sunnyside Mall in 1989. In the 1990s, Spatz led the committee which oversaw the construction of a new theatre complex for Neptune Theatre in Halifax.

Spatz's Southwest Properties is the owner of Bishops Landing in Halifax, as well as other properties located along the Halifax waterfront. In 2013, Spatz partnered with Peter Carver of Minett Real Estate to begin development of a 16-storey apartment building on the waterfront, with an estimated cost of $75 million. The property is owned by the Waterfront Development Corporation, with the property developers being provided with a 99-year lease. The project was the largest in the history of the Waterfront Development Corporation at the time.

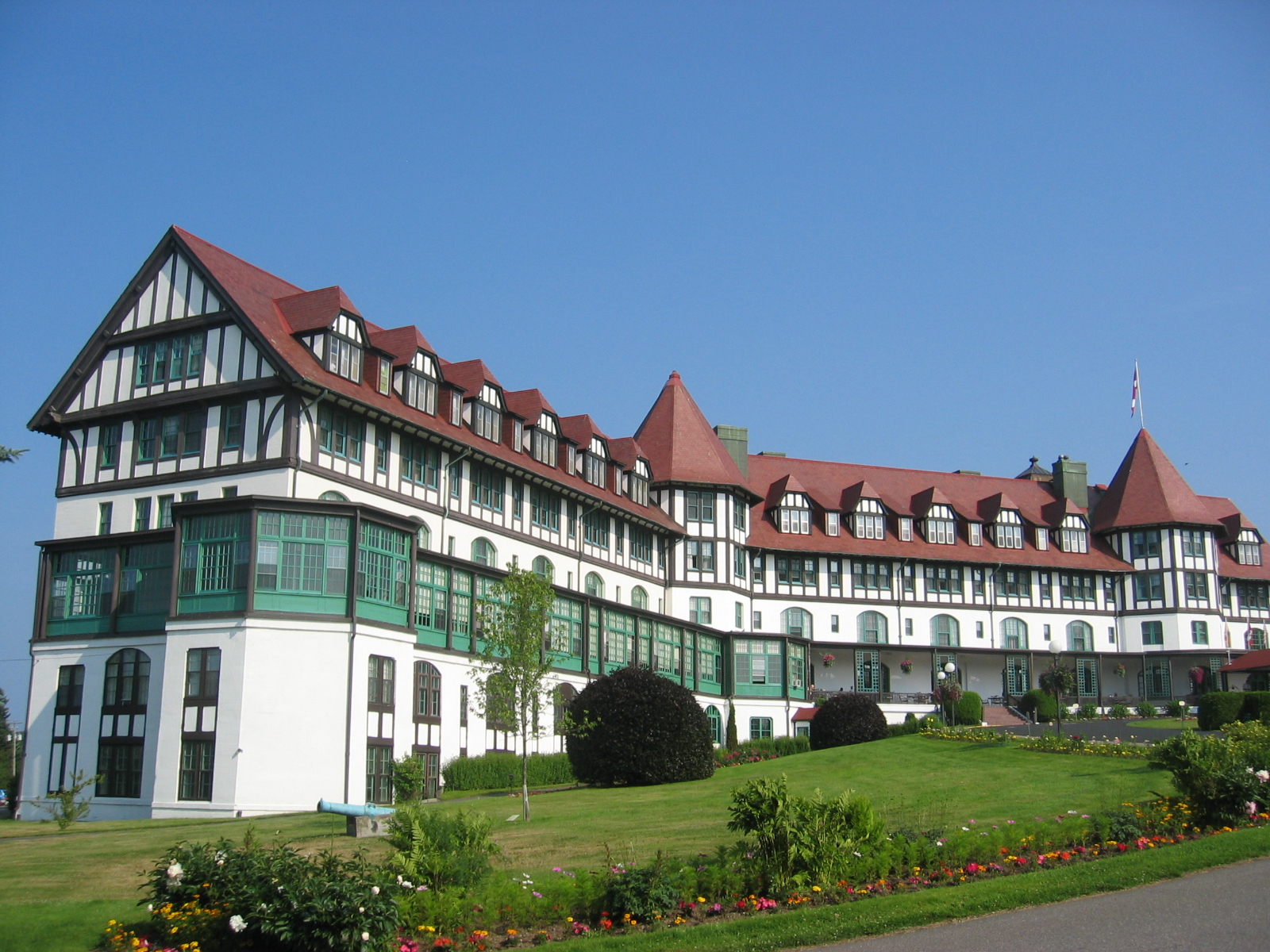
Spatz's Southwest Properties is part-owner of the Algonquin Hotel and Resort

In 2012, Southwest Properties and the American company New Castle Hotels & Resorts purchased the Algonquin Hotel and Resort in Saint Andrews, New Brunswick from the province's provincial government. The same year, Spatz expressed interest in purchasing two additional resort properties in Nova Scotia: the Digby Pines Golf Resort and Spa in Digby, and the Liscombe Lodge Resort and Conference Centre in Liscomb.

In May 2016, Spatz was appointed to the board of directors of the Halifax Port Authority by the Canadian federal government. The port authority reviewed his appointment and found that his position as CEO of Southwest Properties did not constitute a conflict of interest for his work on the board, stating he would not be involved in matters concerning real estate with the Halifax Port Authority.

In 2018, Halifax Regional Council approved amendments to the municipality's land-use bylaws to allow for a major development by Southwest Properties of a property adjacent to Mount Saint Vincent University, once the site of the Sisters of Charity Motherhouse. Spatz said at the time that roughly four percent of the units in the new residential building at the site would be affordable housing.

In 2020, Southwest Properties began to seek approval for a new waterfront development between Bishop's Landing and the Discovery Centre, planning to construct a building designed by the architect Stephen Bugbee to resemble half of a cruise ship. The Halifax municipal councillor Waye Mason argued that the municipality's plan for the Halifax waterfront was "arguably the single most complex plan in HRM", and following a debate between councillors Mason put forward a motion to allow the project to move forward pending changes to Southwest Properties' development plan.

Southwest Properties was the primary developer behind The Pavilion, a 13-storey mixed-used condo building located in Downtown Halifax. The project was still in the design stage when Spatz hired three realtors to begin selling units in the building, with the realtors selling approximately 80% of the units within months of being hired. Every remaining unit in the building was sold by the end of 2020, with Spatz himself acquiring a residence in the building. At the same time as The Pavilion, Southwest Properties also constructed Curve, a 16-storey apartment building which opened in 2020 and won a national design contest.

Spatz also owns real estate in New Brunswick, as well as Florida in the United States.

== Philanthropy ==
Spatz founded the Spatz Foundation in 2008, which makes charitable contributions to organizations in the fields of arts and culture, health, entrepreneurship, and Jewish life. He was appointed to the Dalhousie University board of governors in 2001, serving until 2014, during which time he funded the Jewish studies program at the university.

In 2018, Spatz was included on The Vancouver Sun's list of "most notable political donors in the East", having made a total of eight financial contributions to political parties in Nova Scotia. According to The Vancouver Sun, his political donations amounted to $6,374 to the Progressive Conservative Association of Nova Scotia, $3,780 to the Nova Scotia Liberal Party, and $2,250 to the Nova Scotia New Democratic Party.

== Recognition ==
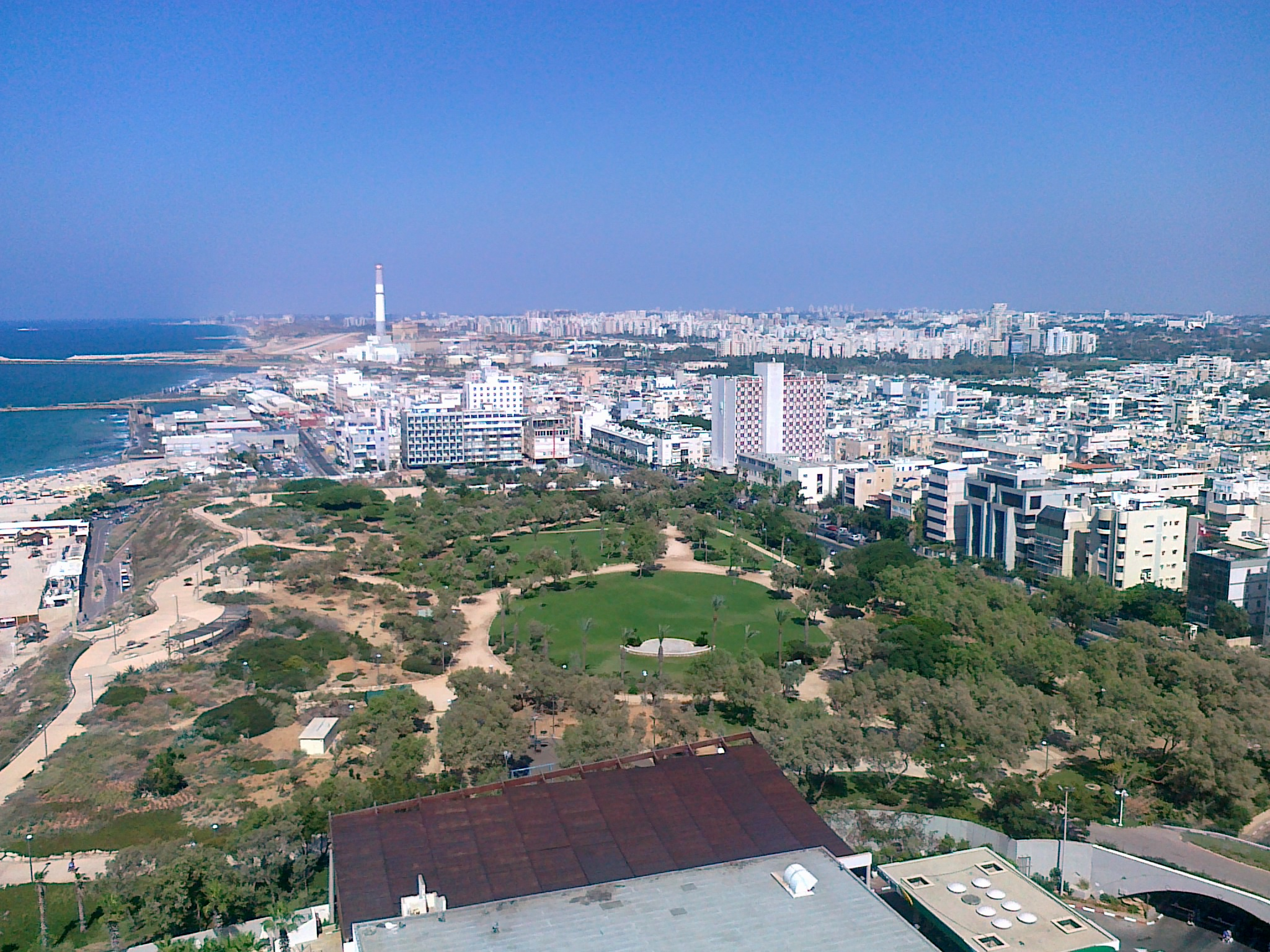
A bike path at Independence Park in Tel Aviv was named in honour of Spatz

Spatz has been the recipient of various awards and distinctions. He received the Queen Elizabeth II Diamond Jubilee Medal in 2013, and was the honoured guest at the 2014 Jewish National Fund (JNF) Negev Dinner, where he was commemorated for his work with the JNF through the Jim Spatz Bike Path at Independence Park in Tel Aviv, Israel. In 2015, he was named CEO of the Year by Atlantic Business Magazine. He was awarded the Humanitarian Award for Nova Scotia by the Canadian Red Cross in 2019, received an honorary Doctor of Laws from Dalhousie University in 2022, and was awarded the Order of Canada in 2023. He is an inductee of the Nova Scotia Business Hall of Fame.

== Personal life ==
Spatz is married to his wife, Val. He has two sons.

== See also ==
- Wadih Fares, another Nova Scotian property developer
