= Josef Kareis =

Member of the Reichsrath for Leopoldstadt
- In office 1897–1899

Personal details
- Born: 14 February 1837 Semice, Austrian Empire
- Died: 12 May 1913 (aged 76) Vienna, Austria-Hungary
- Education: Prague Polytechnical Institute

Josef Kareis (14 February 1837 – 12 May 1913) was an Austrian electrical engineer and politician.

== Biography ==
Kareis was born into a Jewish family in Semice, Bohemia, and studied engineering at the Prague Polytechnical Institute. From 1858 till 1896 he was in the service of the state, first in the department for triangular survey in Tyrol and Croatia until 1863, and thereafter as a telegraph operator in various provinces across Austria. When electrotechnics first became known, Kareis devoted himself to its study, and from 1883 to 1896 edited the Zeitschrift für Elektrotechnik. He also wrote several treatises on the subject, founded the Elektrotechnische Verein in Vienna, and busied himself with many undertakings along this line. He represented his native country in 1883 as secretary of the Internationale Elektrische Ausstellung in Vienna, and in 1889 as vice-president of the International Electrotechnical Congress in Paris.

From 1890 to 1896 Kareis represented Leopoldstadt in the city council. In the 1897 legislative election he was elected delegate from the same district to the Reichsrath, which position he held until 1900.
