= The Chickenburger =

Canadian drive-in diner

Coordinates: 44.73155°N 63.65723°W

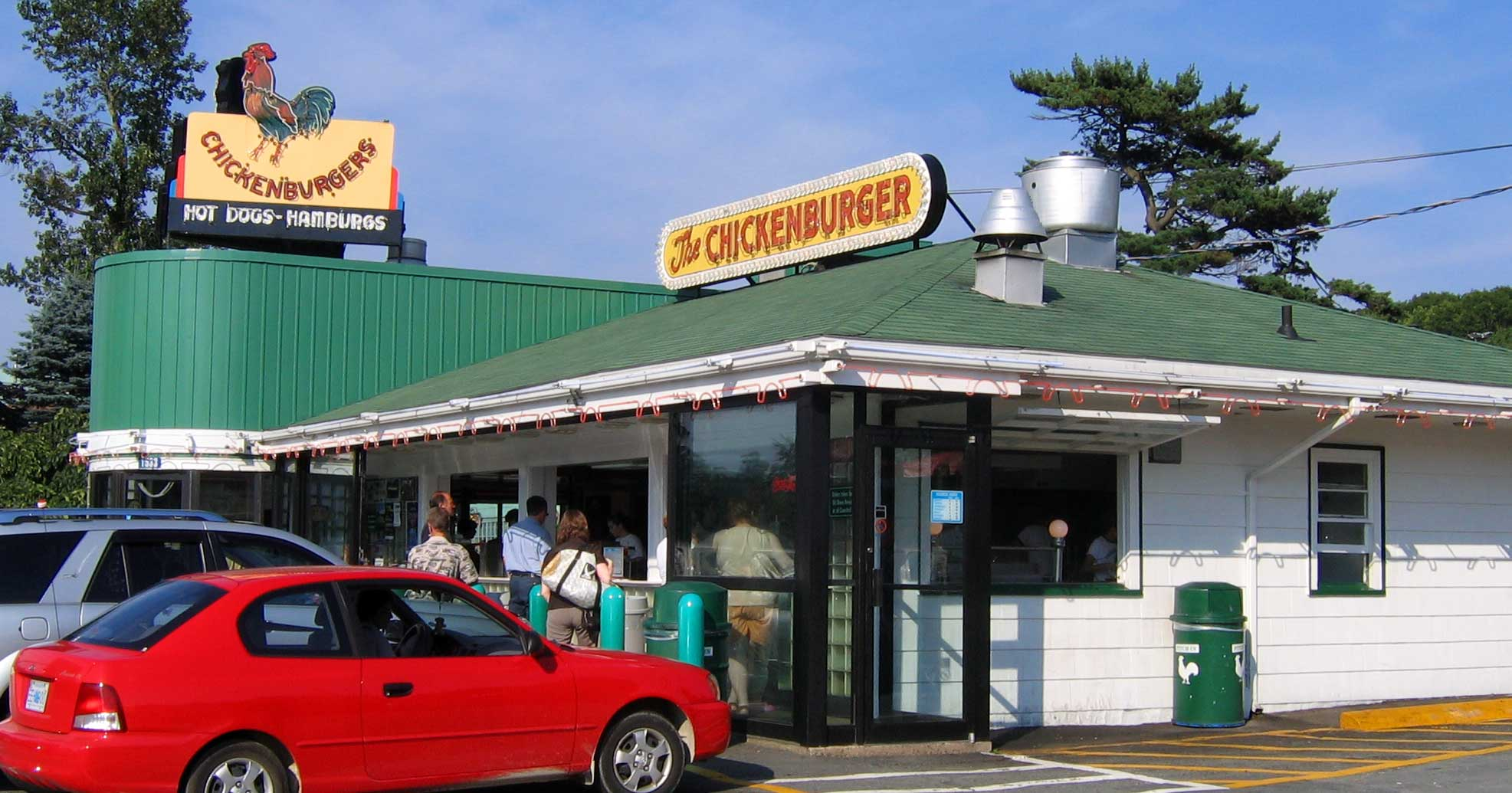
- The Chickenburger restaurant
- Interactive map of The Chickenburger

Restaurant information
- Location: Bedford, Nova Scotia, Canada

The Chickenburger is a Bedford Highway roadside landmark located in Bedford, Nova Scotia that is reputed to be the oldest drive-in diner in Canada.

== History ==
In 1930, Salter Innes founded the Bedford Sunnyside canteen along the Bedford Highway. He hired Bernice Simpson to work the counter. She later married his son Jack, and they bought property across the road to start their own restaurant.

Originally established as the Shadyside take-out counter by Jack Innes and Bernice Simpson Innes, The Chickenburger Lady, in 1939. It became Chickenburger after Bedford Shadyside burned down and was rebuilt in 1940. In 1952, due to road realignment, the restaurant was moved back, so it developed into a full-fledged restaurant, and still maintains its 1950s styling. In 1986, the dining area was expanded, using material from Sunnyside. Mickey MacDonald bought the restaurant from the Innes family in 2007. The Micco Group of Companies bought the restaurant from the MacDonald family.

== See also ==
- The Big Orange, Montreal, Quebec, Canada
- List of drive-in restaurants
