= Josef Schneider Sr. =

Josef Schneider Sr. (29 May 1840 – 14 March 1927) was the first producer of electricity in Germany and founded the Elektrizitätswerk Horb. He was born in Bühlertann and died at the age of 87 in his hometown Horb am Neckar, Baden-Württemberg.

In 1890 Josef Schneider was granted a patent by royal warrant from the King of Württemberg to become the first German electricity producer. The next year, together with Ernst Werner von Siemens, he made significant improvements to the dynamo. In 1892 Germany saw its first electric light with the help of a steam turbine developed by Josef Schneider Sr. The first electricity was sold to the Hohenzollern royal family. Two years later (1894), a fire destroyed the original generating plant, motivating construction of the first private hydro-electric power plant in Horb am Neckar (Black Forest). By 1912, he and Oskar von Miller were the first to connect eleven cities in the Stuttgart-Munich region to an electric grid using high-voltage lines. In 1922, he assisted in the development of the Voith-Francis Turbine.

== 1970s ==
In 1975, the family firm, Elektrizitätswerk Horb KG, was incorporated and granted an electricity monopoly for generation, transmission, and sale of electricity to southwestern Baden-Württemberg. It continued to be owned by the Schneider family. In 1980 Josef Schneider Jr. helped to develop the Ossberg-Streamturbine.

== Schneider Power ==
The Elektrizitätswerk Horb am Neckar KG was sold to EnBW (formerly, Energie Versorgung Schwaben) in 1985. In 2004 Thomas Schneider, the great great grandson of Josef Schneider, founded Schneider Power Inc. (TSXV:SNE), a publicly listed Company on the TSX Venture Exchange and one of Canada's largest wind power producers, with wind turbines operating in Germany, the United States, and Canada.

In 2009 Schneider Power was acquired by Irvine California-based, Quantum Fuel Systems Technologies Worldwide Inc. (NASDAQ:QTWW). As of 2016 Quantum Fuel Systems LLC is wholly owned by K&M Douglas Trust, a family-owned $1 billion private equity firm run by Kevin Douglas.

== See also ==
- Renewable Energy
