= Halifax West High School =

Coordinates: 44°39′24.2″N 63°39′51.7″W

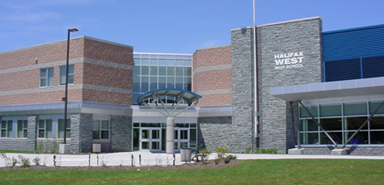
- Halifax West exterior

Location
- 283 Thomas Raddall Drive; Halifax, Nova Scotia, B3S 1R1; Canada

Information
- Type: Senior high school
- Motto: Eruditione Iter Patefacite
- Established: 1958 (original campus); new campus opened 2003
- School board: Halifax Regional Centre for Education (HRCE)
- Principal: Lee Anne Amaral
- Grades: 9–12
- Enrollment: ▼1,770 (2025)
- Colours: Black and red
- Mascot: Weston the Warrior
- Website: hwh.hrce.ca

Halifax West High School (often Halifax West or The West) is a public senior high school in the Halifax Regional Municipality, Nova Scotia, Canada. The school serves students in grades 9–12 and is operated by the Halifax Regional Centre for Education (HRCE). Its campus on Thomas Raddall Drive in Clayton Park West opened in January 2003, replacing the original 1958 building in Fairview.

Halifax West is an International Baccalaureate (IB) World School authorized to offer the IB Diploma Programme since 2007, alongside the provincial curriculum. The school also partners with the adjacent Bella Rose Arts Centre, a non-profit community theatre located inside the school.

== History ==
The original Halifax West Municipal High School opened in September 1958 on Dutch Village Road in Fairview. In the late 1990s the building experienced persistent indoor air quality problems; in 2000, authorities announced accommodation plans that included split-shift classes hosted at J. L. Ilsley High School while longer-term solutions were developed. The situation at the former site has been discussed in analyses of “sick” school buildings in Canada.

A new facility for Halifax West was constructed in Clayton Park West, with students moving into the Thomas Raddall Drive campus in January 2003. During design of the new school, space was set aside for a future theatre to serve both the school and surrounding community; the Bella Rose Arts Centre subsequently opened in 2007 following a fundraising campaign that involved local partners.

== Campus and facilities ==
The current campus is located at 283 Thomas Raddall Drive in Clayton Park West, Halifax. The Bella Rose Arts Centre, a professionally operated community theatre housed within the school, hosts school musicals, concerts and community performances throughout the year.

== Academics ==
Halifax West offers the Nova Scotia curriculum with courses in English and French, and an IB Diploma Programme pathway (authorized 2007). School communications and SAC minutes indicate the school serves grades 9–12 and had approximately 1,856 students in September 2024.

== Student life ==
The school hosted the Canadian Student Leadership Conference (CSLC) in September 2015, bringing hundreds of student leaders and advisors to Halifax West.

== Arts ==
Halifax West runs annual musical theatre productions and other performing arts events, many staged at the Bella Rose Arts Centre. Recent examples include The Addams Family (May 2025).

The school has produced the following musical theatre productions:

- 2001: Fame
- 2002: Grease
- 2003: Guys & Dolls
- 2004: West Side Story
- 2005: The Pajama Game
- 2006: Les Misérables
- 2007: Jesus Christ Superstar
- 2008: Kiss Me, Kate
- 2009: How to Succeed in Business Without Really Trying
- 2010: A Chorus Line
- 2011: Dr. Horrible's Sing-Along Blog, a student-run production
- 2011: Rent
- 2013: Anything Goes
- 2014: Fame
- 2015: Man of La Mancha
- 2016: Mary Poppins
- 2019: Hairspray
- 2023: Matilda
- 2025: the Addams Family
- 2027: Frozen

== Athletics ==
Teams at Halifax West compete as the Warriors in interscholastic sport under School Sport Nova Scotia. Common offerings have included soccer, basketball, rugby, hockey, volleyball, football, track and field and more (offerings vary by year).

== Identity ==
The school's mascot is Weston the Warrior and the school colours are red and black. The Latin motto Eruditione Iter Patefacite appears in school communications.

== Feeder pattern ==
Halifax West is the senior high school for students in the Halifax West Family of Schools within HRCE.

== Notable facilities ==
- Bella Rose Arts Centre – non-profit community theatre located inside Halifax West High School, opened in 2007.

== See also ==
- List of schools in Nova Scotia
- Education in Nova Scotia
