= Josef Felix Müller =

Swiss sculptor, graphic artist and painter

Josef Felix Müller (born December 10, 1955) is a Swiss sculptor, graphic artist and painter. Since 1975 he has lived and worked in the Swiss town of St. Gallen.
