= Semice =

- Municipality
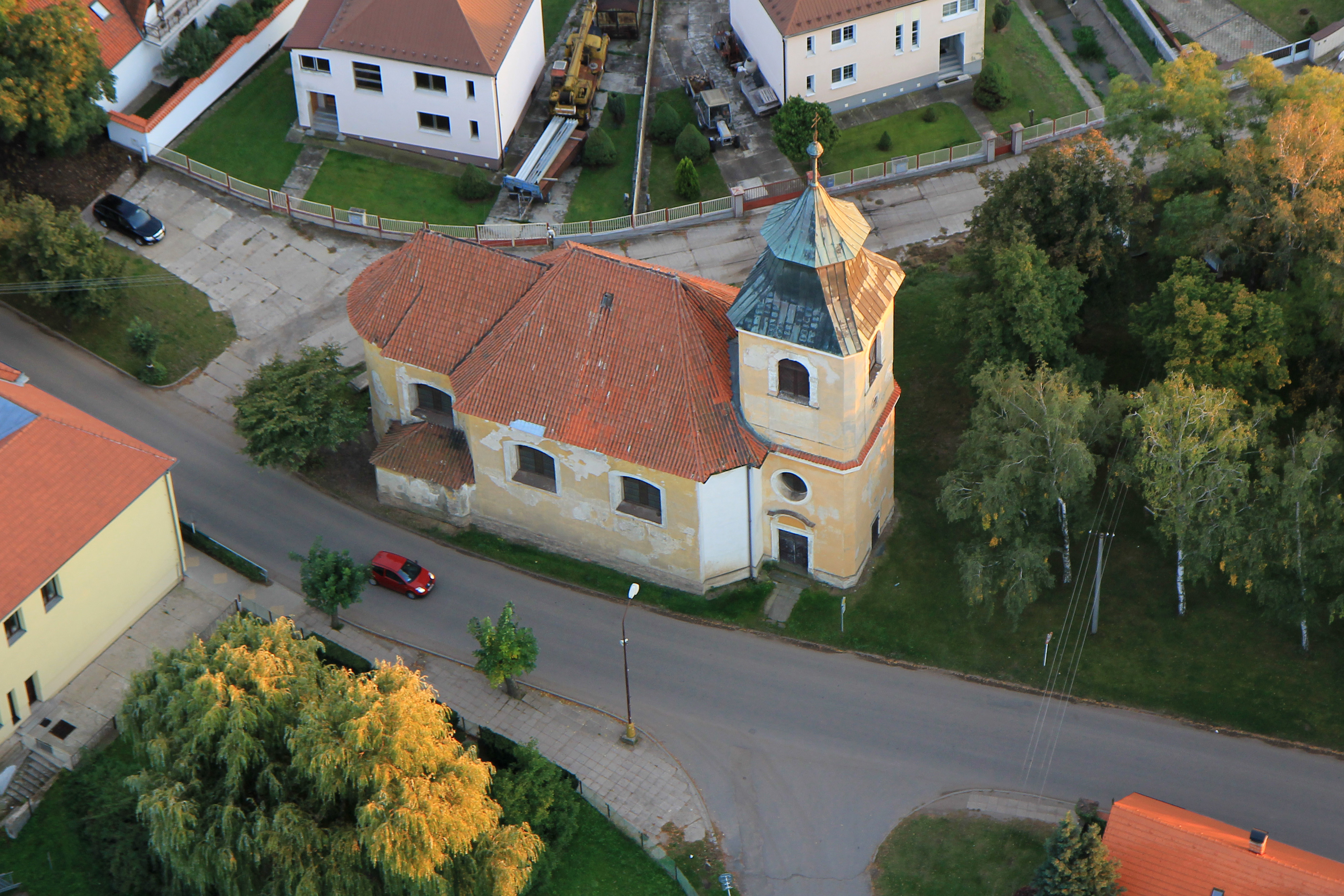
- Church of Saint Mary Magdalene

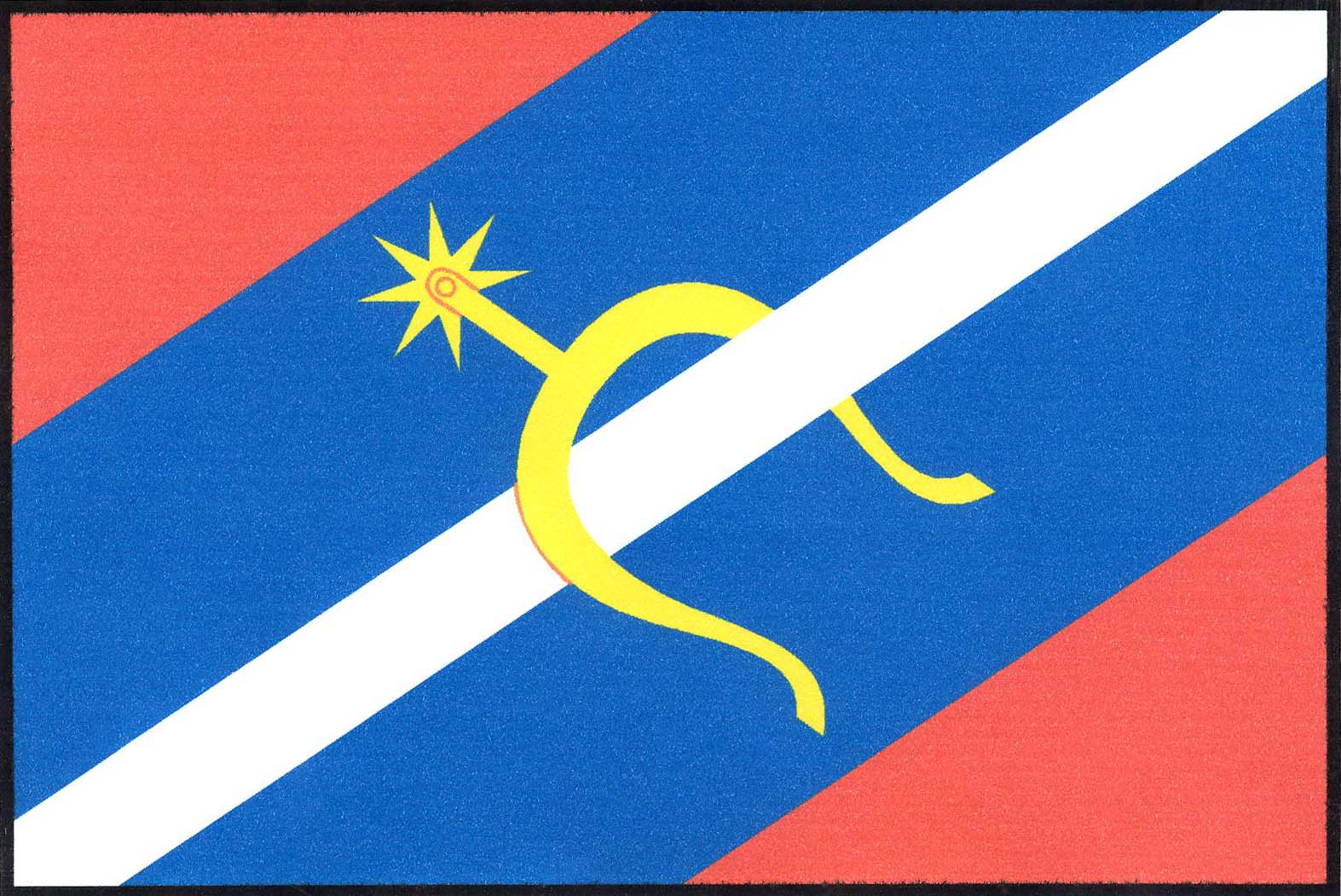
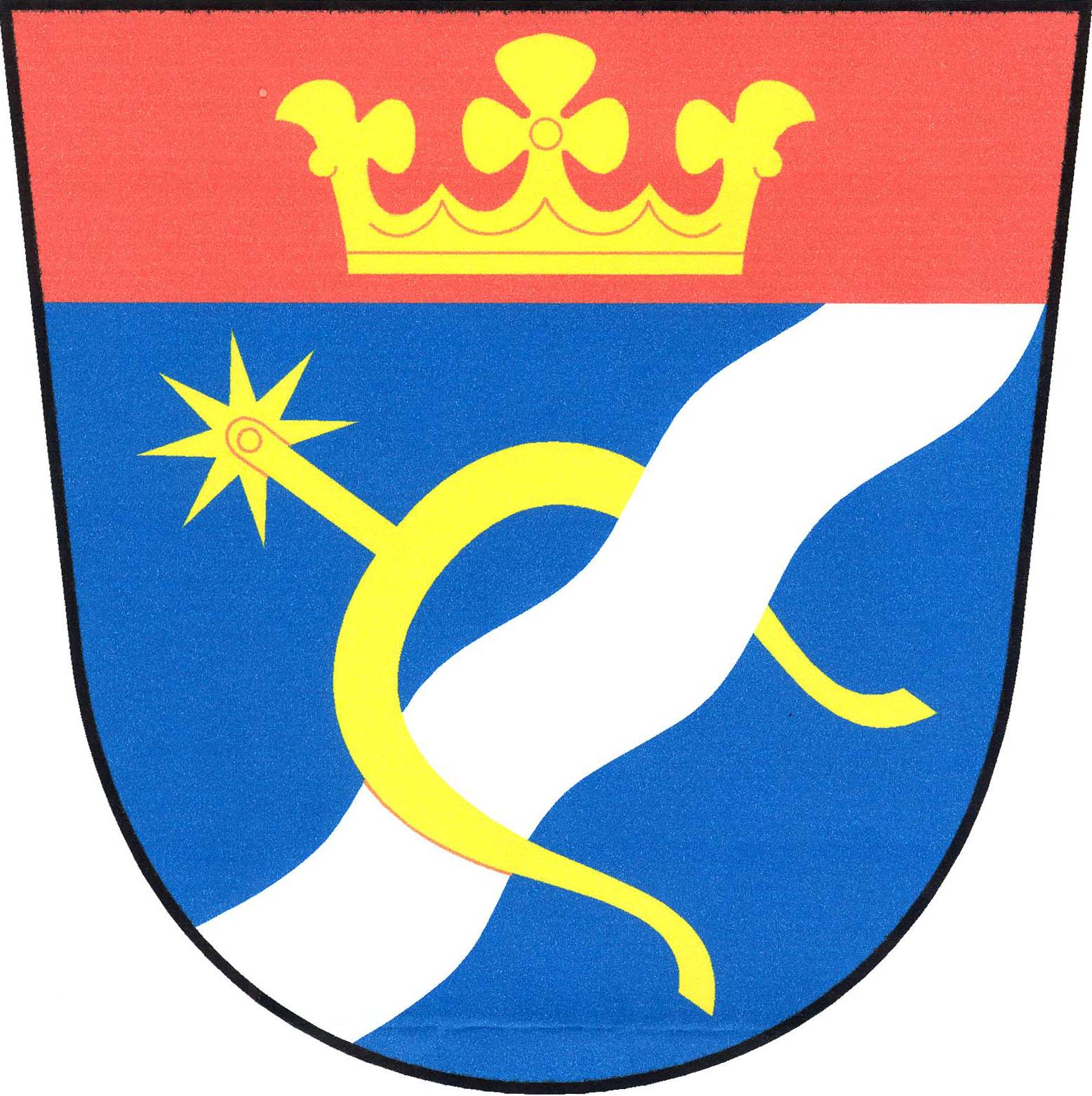
- Flag Coat of arms

- Location in the Czech Republic
- Coordinates: 50°9′46″N 14°52′16″E
- Country: Czech Republic
- Region: Central Bohemian
- District: Nymburk
- First mentioned: 1352

Area
  - Total: 9.43 km^{2} (3.64 sq mi)
- Elevation: 179 m (587 ft)

Population (2026-01-01)
  - Total: 1,445
  - Density: 153/km^{2} (397/sq mi)
- Time zone: UTC+1 (CET)
  - Summer (DST): UTC+2 (CEST)
- Postal code: 289 17
- Website: www.obecsemice.cz

Semice (German: Semitz) is a municipality and village in Nymburk District in the Central Bohemian Region of the Czech Republic. It has about 1,400 inhabitants.

== Etymology ==
The name is derived from the personal name Sem, meaning "the village of Sem's people".

== Geography ==
Semice is located about 12 kilometres (7 mi) west of Nymburk and 25 km (16 mi) east of Prague. It lies in a flat and mainly agricultural landscape in the Central Elbe Table, in the Polabí lowlands. The highest point is the hill Semická hůra at 231 m (758 ft) above sea level. The municipality is situated on the left bank of the Elbe River, which forms the northern municipal border.

== History ==
The first written mention of Semice is from 1352.

== Demographics ==
Historical population

Year	Pop.	±%
1869	642	—
1880	770	+19.9%
1890	796	+3.4%
1900	865	+8.7%
1910	958	+10.8%

Year	Pop.	±%
1921	974	+1.7%
1930	913	−6.3%
1950	759	−16.9%
1961	769	+1.3%
1970	798	+3.8%

Year	Pop.	±%
1980	807	+1.1%
1991	810	+0.4%
2001	912	+12.6%
2011	1,053	+15.5%
2021	1,230	+16.8%

Source: Censuses

== Economy ==
Semice is home to the Bramko Semice company, which is the largest grower and supplier of potatoes and vegetables in the country.

== Transport ==
There are no railways or major roads running through the municipality.

== Sights ==
The main landmark of Semice is the Church of Saint Mary Magdalene. It was built in the Baroque style in 1717 by Count Sporck.
