= Bedford Highway =

Highway in the Halifax Regional Municipality, Nova Scotia, Canada

Bedford Highway

Route information
- Maintained by Halifax Regional Municipality; Transportation & Public Works
- Length: 13.1 km (8.1 mi)
- Component highways: Trunk 1 / Trunk 2

Major junctions
- South end: Hwy 111 / Windsor Street
- Trunk 7 (Dartmouth Road); Trunk 2 (Hammonds Plains Road)
- North end: Hwy 101 / Hwy 102

Location
- Country: Canada
- Province: Nova Scotia

Highway system
- Provincial highways in Nova Scotia; 100-series

The Bedford Highway is a highway in the Halifax Regional Municipality, Nova Scotia that is part of Trunk 2. It runs around the western side of the Bedford Basin. The highway starts at the Windsor Street intersection on the Halifax Peninsula and passes by the communities of Fairview, Rockingham, and Bedford, where it becomes part of Trunk 1 to Highway 101 .

Historically the Bedford Highway was part of the route from Halifax to Windsor, but also formed the first stage of a journey to Truro, with Sackville's Twelve Mile House staging inn marking the start of the Truro road. The never-completed Annapolis Road also began on the Bedford Highway, at today's intersection with Kearney Lake Road, which is believed to partly follow the alignment of the early road.

== Notable places ==
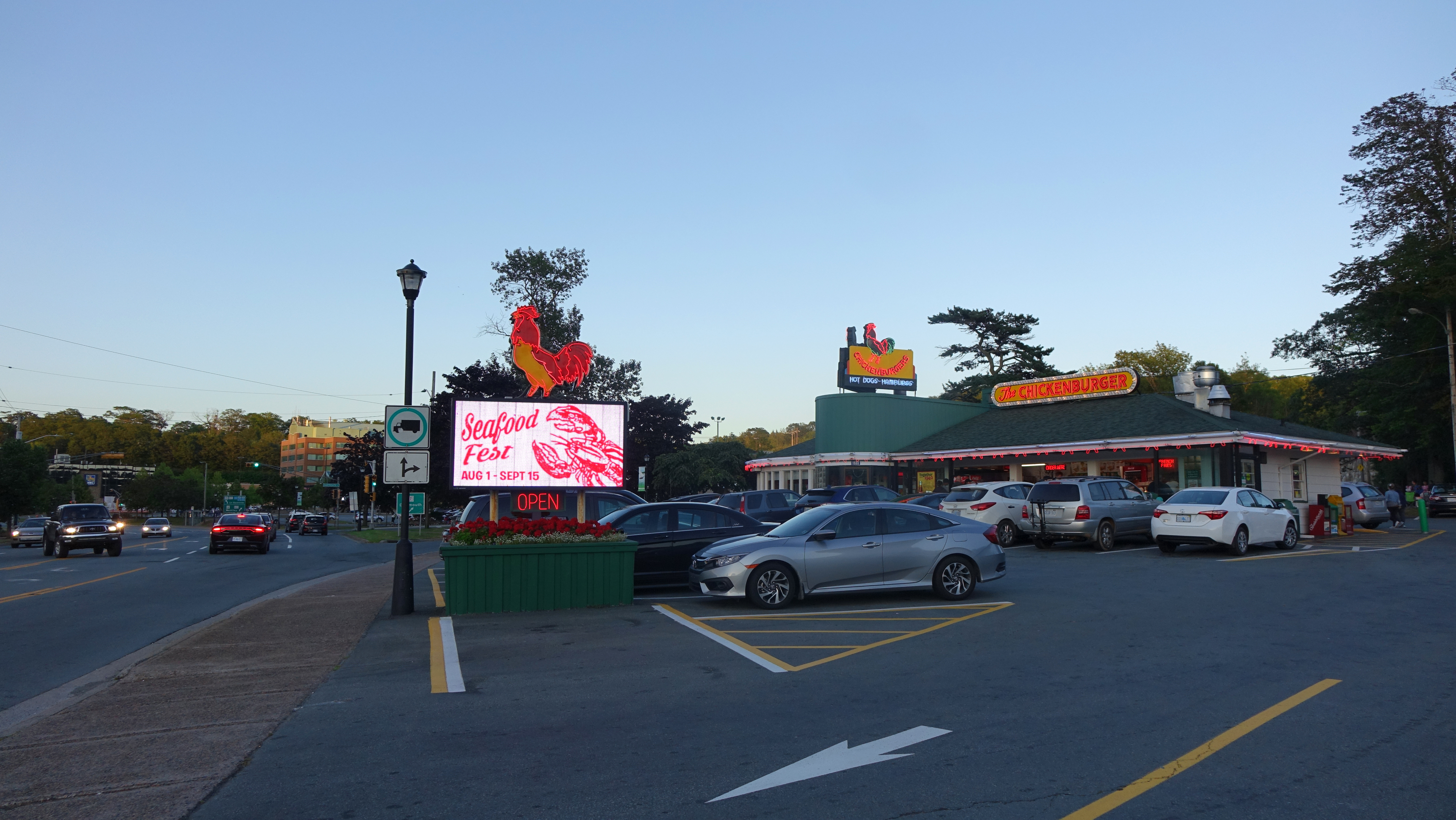
The Chickenburger located at 1531 Bedford Highway (September 2018).

- Fairview Lawn Cemetery
- Mount Saint Vincent University
- Rockingham Community Center
- Clearwater
- Mill Cove Plaza
- The Chickenburger
- Sunnyside Mall
- Bedford Place Mall
- Bedford Range Ballpark
- House of Intercessory Prayer Ministries (HIPM)

== Major intersections ==
The entire route is located in Halifax Regional Municipality.

Location	km	mi	Exit	Destinations	Notes
Halifax	0.0	0.0		Lady Hammond Road Hwy 111 east / Windsor Street (Trunk 2 south) – MacKay Bridge, Dartmouth	Windsor Street Exchange; south end of Trunk 2 concurrency; continues as Lady Hammond Road
Halifax	0.5	0.31		To Trunk 3 / Hwy 102 / Joseph Howe Drive	Interchange
Halifax	1.3	0.81		Bayview Road	
Halifax	2.6	1.6		Flamingo Drive	
Halifax	4.0	2.5		Kearney Lake Road	
Halifax	5.9	3.7		Larry Uteck Boulevard	
Bedford	7.6	4.7		Southgate Drive	
Bedford	8.3	5.2		Hammonds Plains Road (Route 213 west)	
Bedford	9.7	6.0		Meadowbrook Drive	
Bedford	10.5	6.5		Union Street	
Bedford	11.0	6.8		Dartmouth Road (Trunk 7 east) – Dartmouth	
Bedford	11.2	7.0		Trunk 2 north (Rocky Lake Drive) – Waverley	Trunk 1 eastern terminus; north end of Trunk 2 concurrency; south end of Trunk 1 concurrency
Lower Sackville	12.2– 13.1	7.6– 8.1	1G/H	Hwy 102 – Airport, Truro, Halifax	Signed as exits 1H (north) and 1G (south); exit 4A/B on Hwy 102
Lower Sackville	12.2– 13.1	7.6– 8.1	1K	Trunk 1 west (Cobequid Road) – Lower Sackville	Eastbound exit, westbound entrance; north end of Trunk 1 concurrency
Lower Sackville	12.2– 13.1	7.6– 8.1	—	Hwy 101 west – Windsor, Annapolis Valley	Continues as Hwy 101
1.000 mi = 1.609 km; 1.000 km = 0.621 mi: Concurrency terminus; Incomplete access; Route transition
