= Josef Schmid (flight surgeon) =

NASA flight surgeon and Major General in the United States Air Force Reserves

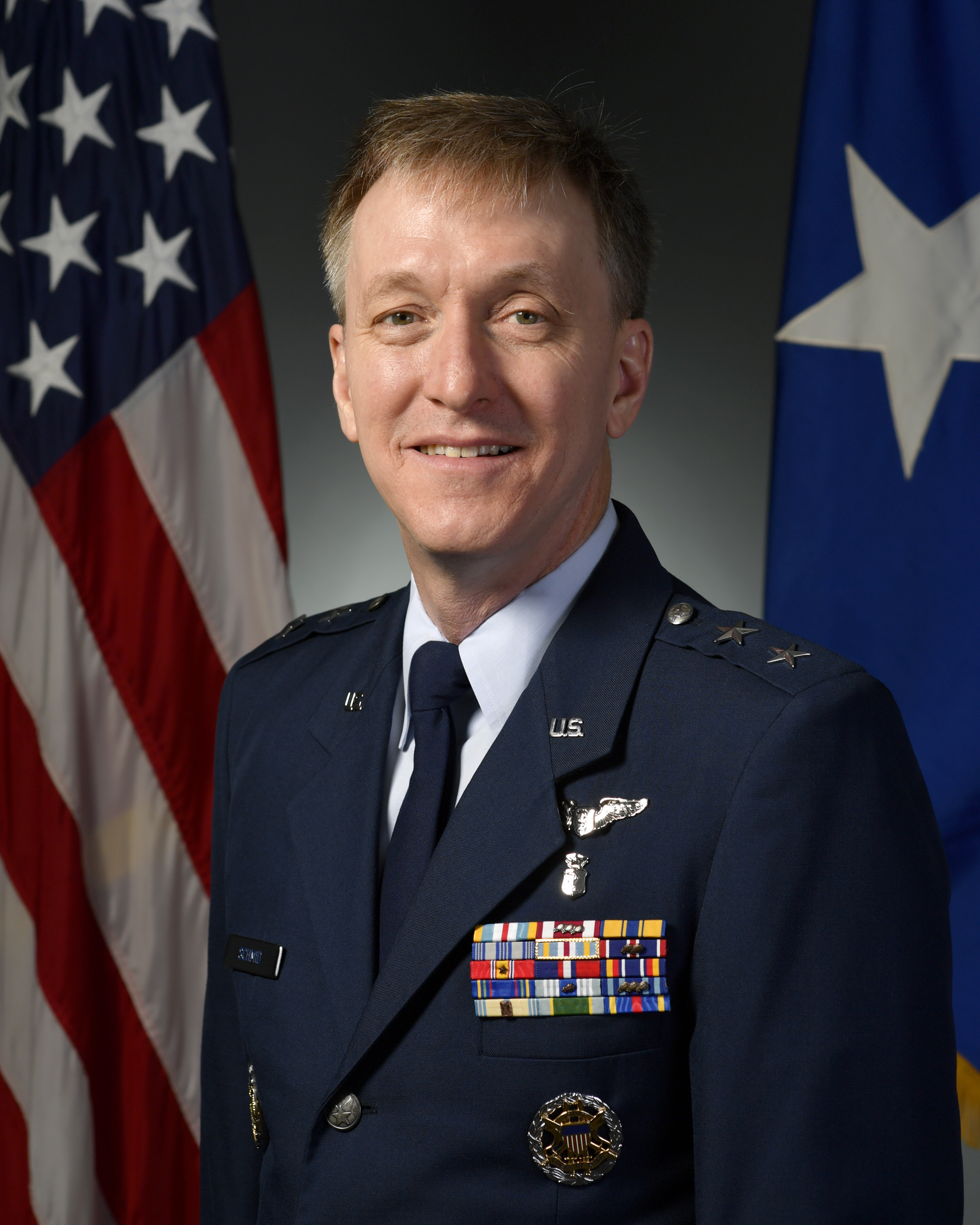
- Born: Josef Francis Schmid III; 6 July 1965 (age 59); Stuttgart, West Germany
- Education: Belmont Abbey College (BS, Biology); Wake Forest University School of Medicine (MD); University of Texas Medical Branch (MPH)
- Occupation: Medical doctor
- Employer: NASA
- Known for: Flight surgeon
- Title: Crew Surgeon

Josef F. Schmid (born 6 July 1965) is a German-American physician, NASA flight surgeon and a major general in the United States Air Force Reserves. He served as an aquanaut on the joint NASA-NOAA NEEMO 12 underwater exploration mission in May 2007. On 8 October 2021 he became one of the first humans to be Holoported off the planet and into space, visiting the International Space Station by telepresence.

== Education ==
Schmid was born in Stuttgart, West Germany. He graduated from Belmont Abbey College in Belmont, North Carolina, in 1988 with an Honors degree in biology. While at Belmont Abbey College, Schmid was a summer intern at NASA. He received his medical degree from Wake Forest University School of Medicine in 1992. He completed his family practice residency at David Grant USAF Medical Center and then served tours in Okinawa, Japan, and Frankfurt, Germany. Following his active duty Air Force service, Schmid then obtained his Master of public health degree in 2001 and an aerospace medicine residency at the University of Texas Medical Branch (UTMB) in Galveston, Texas. Schmid is board certified and a fellow of the American Academy of Family Physicians. He lives in Houston, Texas and is married.

== Honors and awards ==
Schmid's special honors and awards include:

- Fellow, American Academy of Family Physicians
- NASA Group Awards for Flight Medicine Clinic, Electronic Medical Record Development and Space Medicine Training
- NASA Individual Performance Awards
- Tom McNish USAF Reserves National Physician Recruiting Award
- USAF Health Professions Scholarship Program Recipient
- Belmont Abbey Anne Horne Little Scholarship Recipient
- Defense Superior Service Medal
- Air Force Meritorious Service Medal
- Air Force Commendation Medal
- Air Force Achievement Medal
- Air Force Outstanding Unit Medals
- Various other military service and campaign awards
- 2008 Belmont Abbey College Wall of Fame Honoree

== NASA career ==
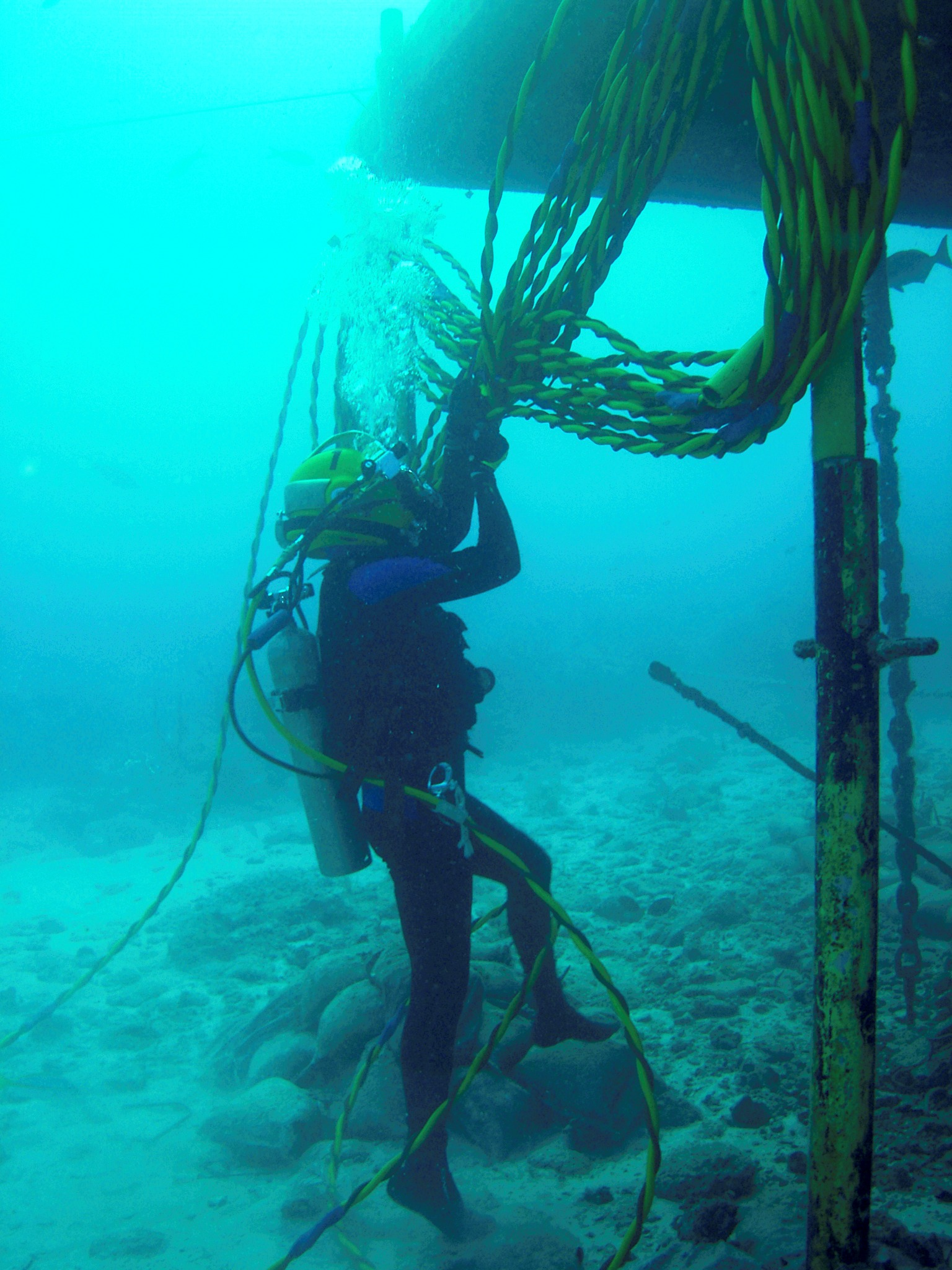
Schmid performing EVA during NEEMO 12 mission

Schmid served as the deputy crew surgeon for the STS-116, which was completed in December 2006. His duties during shuttle missions included the primary care and medical certification for those assigned astronauts, medical training of the shuttle crew medical officers and crew and medical support during shuttle launch and landing. He also staffed the shuttle surgeon console in Mission Control during missions, where he monitored physiologic data during extravehicular activities (EVA) and provided real-time telemedicine via private medical conferences directly with the crew. Schmid held shuttle Mission Control console certification and currently holds International Space Station surgeon console certification. Schmid flies as a T-38 crewmember and has flown many KC-135 Reduced Gravity flights as the medical monitor and as a subject for medical and surgical training. Schmid is a mentor for NASA's High Aerospace Scholars.

Schmid is a NASA flight surgeon in the Medical Operations Branch at Johnson Space Center in Houston. He is also the NASA/UTMB Aerospace Medicine Residency co-director. Schmid served as the commander of the 433rd Aerospace Medicine Squadron in Lackland Air Force Base, Texas.

In May 2007, Schmid became an aquanaut through his participation in the joint NASA-NOAA, NEEMO 12 (NASA Extreme Environment Mission Operations) project, an exploration research mission held in Aquarius, the world's only undersea research laboratory. He was the first NASA flight surgeon to serve on a NEEMO mission. Schmid was the crew surgeon for the STS-120, which visited the International Space Station (ISS) in October–November 2007. He served as crew surgeon again for ISS Expedition 23/24 (2010), and is serving as deputy crew surgeon for ISS Expedition 29/30 (starting in September 2011).

Schmid's interests include surgeon-guided remote robotics, center-of-gravity studies for future lunar missions, and robotics demonstrations for schoolchildren.

On 8 October 2021, Schmid became one of the first humans to be Holoported off the planet and into space, visiting the International Space Station by telepresence.
