= Josef Schmid (theologian) =

German Catholic theologian

Josef Schmid (Holzhausen Bad Aibling, 26 January 1883 – Munich, 4 September 1975) was a German Catholic theologian. He was professor of New Testament and hermeneutics at LMU Munich. He published a standard work on the Greek text of the Book of Revelation (1956). He also made an important contribution towards the reconstruction of the Q-source, a lost source used by both Matthew and Luke to write their gospels. then, later, studies on the Gospel of Mark.
