= Sunnyside Mall =

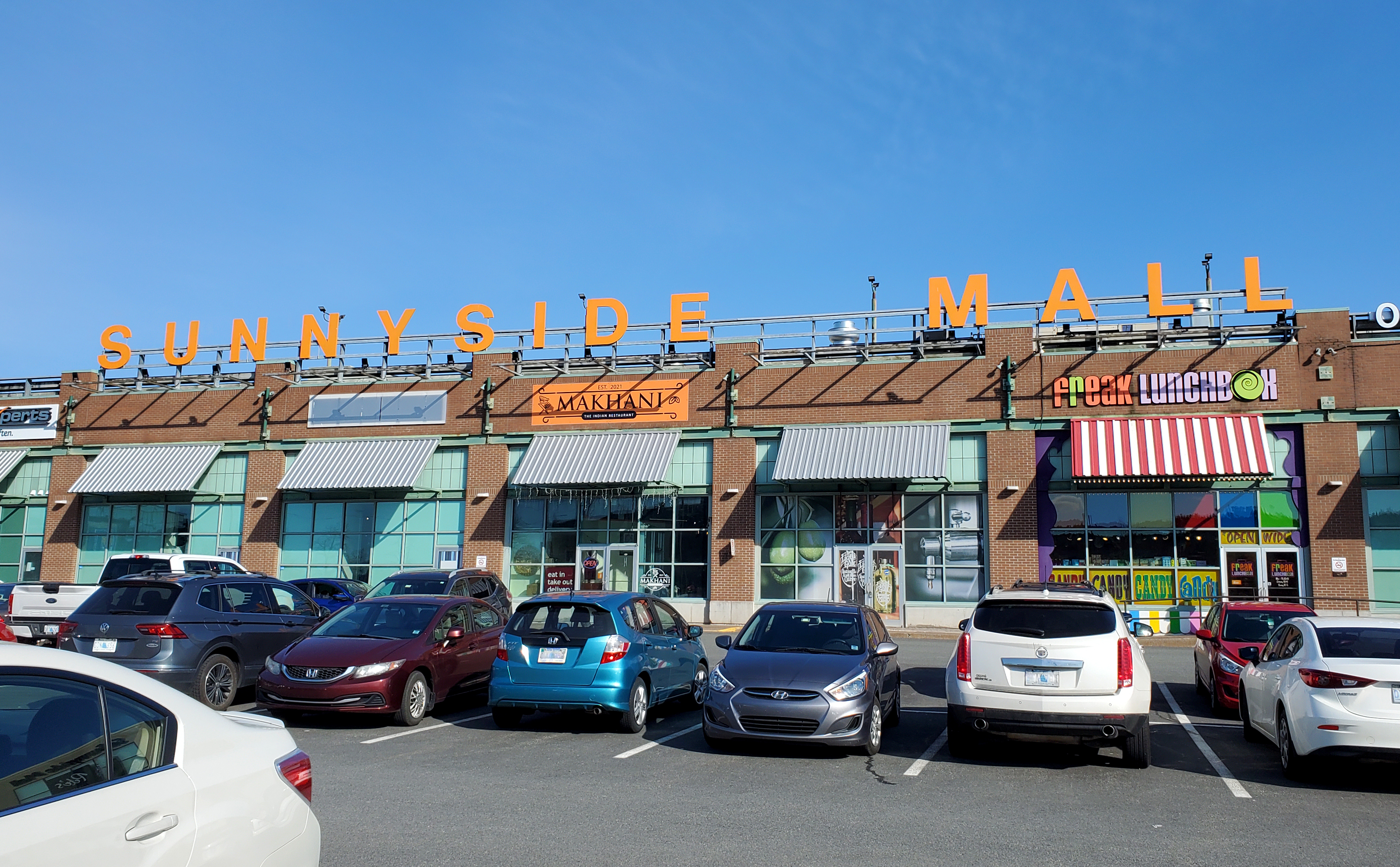
- Sunnyside Mall in 2022
- Location: Bedford, Nova Scotia, Canada
- Coordinates: 44°43′58.2″N 63°39′15.1″W
- Address: 1595 Bedford Hwy.
- Opened: 1963
- Num. of stores: 60+
- Num. of anchor tenants: 3
- Floor area: 311,000 sq ft (28,900 m^{2})
- Floors: 2 with 6 floor office building
- Website: sunnysidemall.ca

The Sunnyside Mall is a 311,000 sq ft (28,900 m^{2}) Canadian shopping mall in Bedford, Nova Scotia.

== See also ==
- List of Canada's largest shopping malls
- List of shopping malls in Canada
- Bedford Place
