= Josef Schmid (composer) =

German conductor and composer (1890–1969)

Josef Schmid (1890, in Germany – 1969, in New York City) was a conductor, composer, and composition teacher. He was one of the first students of Alban Berg, with whom he studied before World War I. As a conductor Schmid had been an assistant to both Zemlinsky and Erich Kleiber. As a composer Schmid was associated with Berg and Webern but considered himself a musical "godson" of Schoenberg. After World War I Schmid emigrated to New York City and established himself as a teacher of composition, basing his teaching on the writings of Schoenberg. His composition students included Joe Maneri, Gus Pardalis, Harold Seletsky, Robert Di Domenica, and Frieda Schmitt-Lermann.
