= Josef Jungmann (theologian) =

German-Austrian Catholic theologian

Josef Jungmann (12 November 1830, in Münster – 25 November 1885, in Innsbruck) was a German-Austrian Catholic theologian.

== Life ==
From 1850 he studied theology and philosophy at the Collegium Germanicum in Rome, becoming ordained as a priest in 1855. In 1857 he became a member of the Society of Jesus, and during the following year, relocated as a lecturer to the University of Innsbruck. At Innsbruck, he became a professor of ecclesiastical eloquence and catechetics at the university as well as a professor of liturgy at the theological konvikt.

== Selected works ==
- Die Schönheit und die schöne Kunst: nach den Anschauungen der sokratischen und der christlichen Philosophie in ihrem Wesen dargestellt (1866) – Beauty and fine art: according to the views of the Socratic and Christian philosophy represented in nature.
- Das Gemüth, und das Gefühlsvermögen der neueren Psychologie (1868) – The mind and the ability to feel the modern psychology.
- Aesthetik (3rd edition, 1886) – Aesthetics.
- Theorie der geistlichen Beredsamkeit : akademische Vorlesungen (2 volumes, 3rd edition 1895) – Theory of spiritual eloquence: academic lectures.
