= Lakeview, Halifax, Nova Scotia =

Lakeview
- Community
- Location within Nova Scotia
- Coordinates: 44°46′03″N 63°37′45″W
- Country: Canada
- Province: Nova Scotia
- Municipality: Halifax Regional Municipality
- Community council: North West Community Council

Lakeview is a community of Halifax Regional Municipality, Nova Scotia, Canada.

== Geography ==
Lakeview consists of one street (off of Cobequid Road), plus a small subdivision. The community is located approximately 29 km (18 mi) from Downtown Halifax.

Nearby communities are:

- Bedford to the south
- Lower Sackville to the west
- Waverley to the east
- Windsor Junction to the north

== Government ==
=== Municipal ===
Lakeview is part of Municipal District 16: Bedford-Wentworth, and is part of the North West Regional Council.

Since 1972, Lakeview has been home to the Halifax Search and Rescue at 116 Lakeview Road.

== Parks and recreation ==
The community has a small playground and park are staffed by local youth during the summer months. It also has an artificial beach attached to the park on Rocky Lake that is open to the public however it is not staffed.

There is also a small grassy park with a walking path to the railroad track that once housed a small train station.

== Transportation ==
=== Roads ===
The major road that connects Lakeview with other communities is Cobequid Road. Cobequid Road gives access to Highway 1 (Sackville Drive), Highway 101, and Highway 102.

=== Public transport ===
Halifax Transit provides public transport throughout the built-up area of Halifax Regional Municipality.

The Cobequid Terminal is less-than 6 km (3.7 mi) from Lakeview, and gives access to communities and neighbourhoods throughout the conurbation of Halifax Regional Municipality.

Wheelchair – Uses Accessible Low Floor (ALF) buses only
Rush Hour Service Only
Designated Bike Route
MetroLink Service
MetroX Service

Route number	Route name	Features	Inner terminal	Outer terminal	Notes
82	First Lake		Cobequid	Sackville	Board this bus route at stop 6688, on the corner of First Lake Drive & Cobequid Road. This route takes the user to the Sackville Terminal in Lower Sackville.
182	First Lake Express		Scotia Square	Sackville	Board this bus route at stop 6688, on the corner of First Lake Drive & Cobequid Road. Route 182 (First Lake Express) runs from the Scotia Square Terminal in Downtown Halifax to the Sackville Terminal in Lower Sackville.
