= Bay View High School =

Bay View High School can refer to several different schools:

- Bay View High School (HRM)
- Bay View High School (Karachi)
- Bay View High School (Milwaukee)
