= Waverley, Nova Scotia =

Waverley
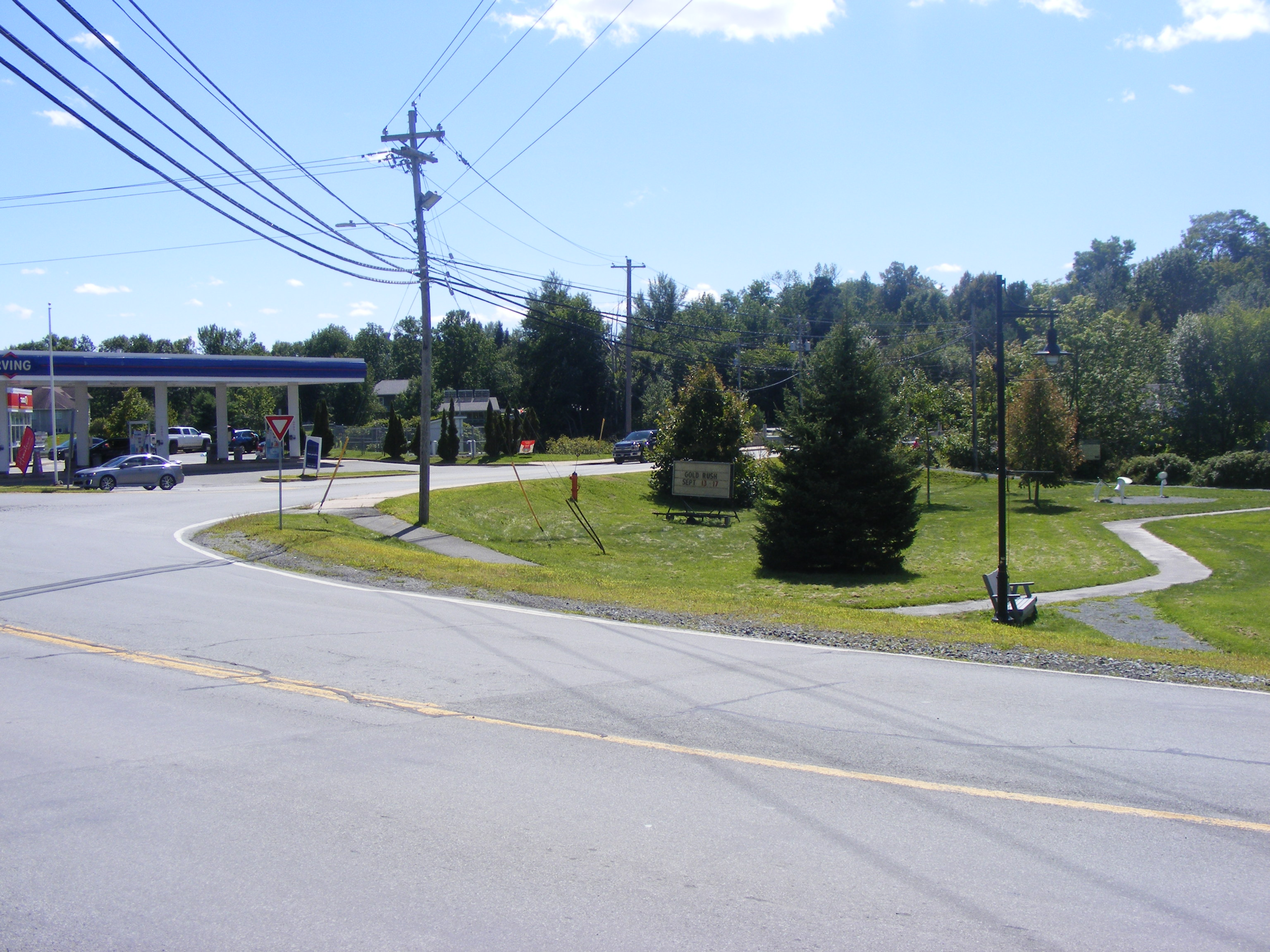

- Location within Nova Scotia
- Coordinates: 44°46′22″N 63°34′41″W
- Country: Canada
- Province: Nova Scotia
- Municipality: Halifax Regional Municipality
- Planning Area: Cole Harbour & Westphal
- Founded: 1847
- Amalgamated with Halifax: April 1, 1996

Area
  - Total: 2.9 km^{2} (1.1 sq mi)

Population (2021)
  - Total: 858
  - Density: 295/km^{2} (760/sq mi)
- Postal code: B2T, B2R
- Telephone Exchanges: (902) 576, 860, 861
- Website: Waverley Nova Scotia

Waverley is a suburban community of the Halifax Regional Municipality, in Nova Scotia, Canada. It has a rich history in gold mining. It lies north of Dartmouth, and south of Fall River.

== History ==
Waverley was first settled by Charles Pillsbury Allen who established a chair factory in the area. Waverley was named after the Waverley novels by Sir Walter Scott. Allen's original land purchase included about 700 acres (280 ha) of land in 1847 for the price of 50 pounds. Although there have been extensive renovations since it was first built, his original house still stands today at 2550 Rocky Lake Drive as "An Olde Manor House Bed and Breakfast" near the junction of Lakes Thomas and William. A nearby high school, Charles P. Allen High School in the neighbouring town of Bedford carries his name.

Allen's son-in-law, Cornelius Blois, is often credited with discovering gold in Waverley. Two major gold mining periods ensued between 1861 through the early 20th century. Waverley became a boom town with highly skilled gold miners coming from Germany and England. Saloons, hotels, camp followers and the usual trappings of a gold town sprang up quickly, and there were even instances of murders and riots. A third attempt to restart the gold industry occurred years later in the 1930s, but it proved unprofitable and lasted only a few years. Other industries in Waverley have included millworking and forestry. It is also worthy of note that the Shubenacadie Canal system runs through Waverley, between Lake William and Lake Thomas.

Many street names in Waverley reflect families that have been long established in the area. From the early 1930s until the mid-1980s, there existed in Waverley near the bridge, a service station operated and owned by Warren H. Isnor (deceased), and was up until the mid-1980s, the oldest existing service station with the same owner, in the province.

== Demographics ==
In the 2021 Census of Population conducted by Statistics Canada, Waverley had a population of 858 living in 360 of its 373 total private dwellings, a change of 5.5% from its 2016 population of 813. With a land area of 2.9 km^{2} (1.1 sq mi), it had a population density of 295.9/km^{2} (766.3/sq mi) in 2021.

== Modern day and landmarks ==
Modern-day Waverley is mostly a bedroom community. Major landmarks included one elementary school, newly built in September 2010, a post office, the Waverley Manor retirement home, the Waverley Heritage Museum; which is housed in the former St. John's Anglican church, Charles P. Allen House, and the Waverley Gold Mining Manager's House, which now operates as "The Adelaide Respite Care". There is a gravel quarry in the area, as well as the Nova Scotia Firefighters School. There is also the Cheema Aquatic Club; a canoe and kayak club which consistently produces high caliber National and Olympic Team athletes.

== Gold Rush Days ==
Each Labour Day weekend, Waverley holds a celebration at a park known as "The Village Green" called 'Gold Rush Days', to commemorate its gold-mining history. Highlights include the Gold Rush Days Parade, karaoke, an arts and crafts show, fireworks, and the Miss Waverley Gold Rush contest.

=== Gold Rush Gus ===
The mascot of Gold Rush Days is a cartoon character resembling Yosemite Sam called "Gold Rush Gus". Until the amalgamation of Waverley into the HRM in 1996, all fire apparatus of the Waverley Fire Department had a picture of him painted on the side. WFD vehicles also had the distinction of being the only ones in the local fire district at the time of being painted yellow; an homage to the village's gold mining history. Presently only those vehicles remaining in service from pre-amalgamation with their original yellow paint still carry Gus' image.

== Halifax Regional Search and Rescue ==
Waverley is the original home of Halifax Regional Search and Rescue. On September 3, 1998, the organisation undertook the largest Mutual Aid Search operation in Nova Scotia's history. With the crash of Swissair Flight 111 off the coast of Nova Scotia, Halifax Regional Search and Rescue was charged with primary responsibility for all ground operations including military operations and other ground SAR teams. On November 5, 1998, 64 days later, volunteers had contributed 48,780 hours with 3,141 person days. The current headquarters of HRSR is located at 116 Lakeview Rd in the nearby community of Lakeview just over 4 kilometers from their original location.

== Communications ==
- First three digits of the postal code:
  - B2T, B2R
- Area Code:
  - 902, 782
- First three digits of telephone numbers:
  - 861 - Aliant
  - 576, 860, 861 - Eastlink
- Internet service providers:
  - Cable Internet access - Eastlink
  - Fiber-optic Internet - Bell Aliant
  - DSL - Aliant
