= Fall River, Nova Scotia =

Fall River
- Location of Fall River, Nova Scotia
- Coordinates: 44°49′34.75″N 63°36′29″W
- Country: Canada
- Province: Nova Scotia
- Municipality: Halifax Regional Municipality
- Community council: North West Community Council
- District: 1: Waverley - Fall River - Musquodoboit Valley
- Founded: Late 1700s
- Amalgamated with Halifax: April 1, 1996

Area
  - Land: 14.89 km^{2} (5.75 sq mi)

Population (2021)
  - Total: 2,474
  - Density: 166/km^{2} (430/sq mi)
- Time zone: UTC-4 (AST)
  - Summer (DST): UTC-3 (ADT)
- Canadian Postal code: B2T
- Area code: 902
- Telephone Exchange: 576 860 861
- Website: www.myfallriver.ca

Fall River is a suburban community located in Nova Scotia, Canada within the Halifax Regional Municipality. It is located north-northeast of the Bedford Basin, northeast of Bedford and Lower Sackville and north of Waverley.

Fall River's name is derived from a stream running between Miller Lake and Lake Thomas which had a waterfall. These falls supplied water power for several mills during the 19th century as well as a local electrical utility during the early 20th century. The waterfall was demolished in the late 1950s as a result of the construction of the Bicentennial Highway leading to Halifax; the waterfall was located where the 4-lane expressway currently runs up the hill from the crossing of Lake Thomas to the interchange with Highway 118 at Miller Lake. Hydro-electric power is now generated by a tunnel that carries the water from Miller Lake which once flowed through this stream and down the waterfall. Turbines produce electricity for the main grid, during peak periods.

== History ==
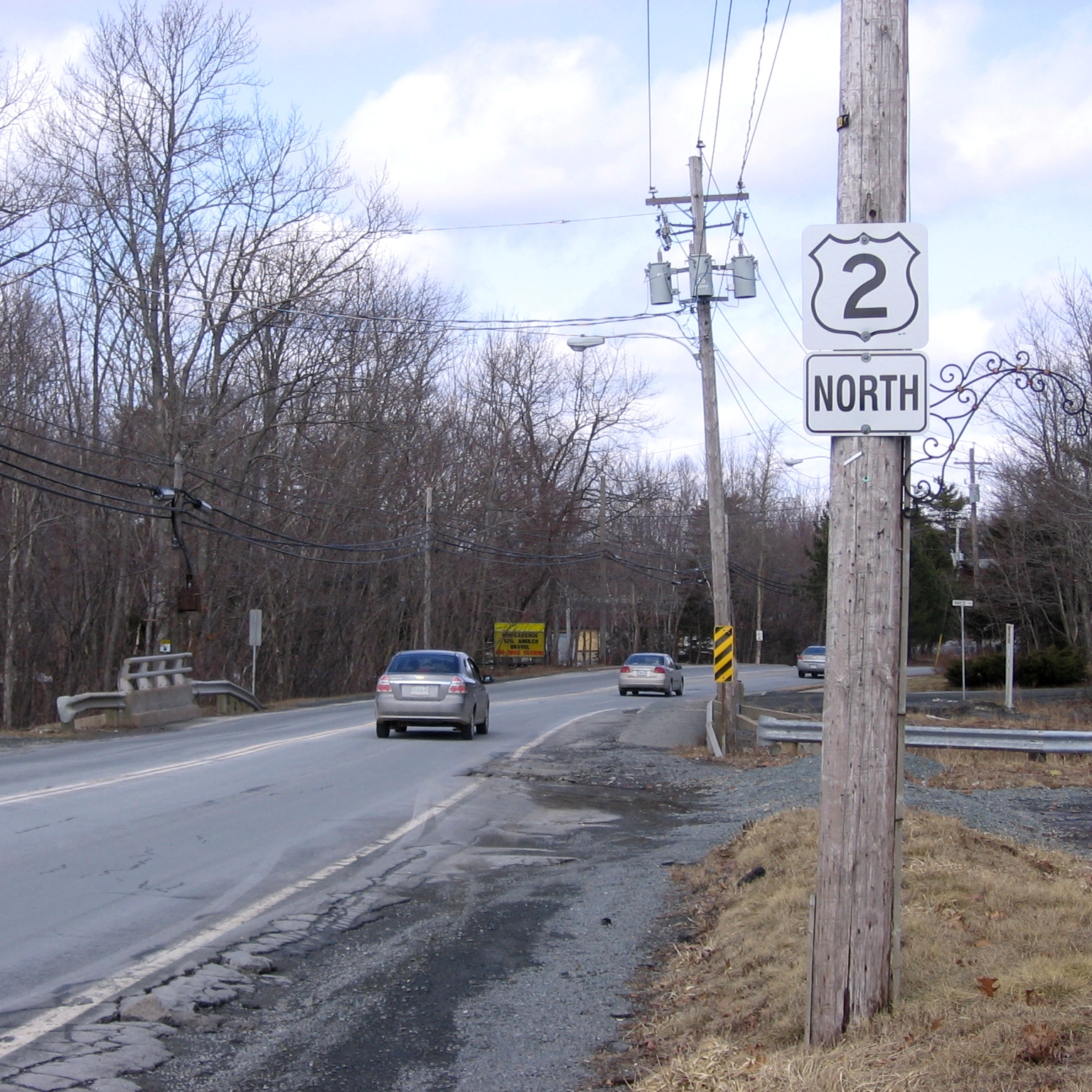
Nova Scotia Trunk 2 forms one of the main thoroughfares in Fall River. Portions of Trunk 2, Fall River Road and Blue Hill Road were originally part of the Great Road between Halifax and Truro.

The Mi'kmaq Nation and its predecessors were known to have inhabited Fall River prior to European settlement, using the waterways for a portage route connecting with the Shubenacadie Valley. The Mik'maq reportedly used this waterway to attack the settlement at Halifax in its early days during a conflict with English settlers.

The first European people in the area arrived during the late 18th century, and some of these earliest settlers were German. In particular one German family named Muller (now anglicized to Miller) established themselves in Fall River, and some of their descendants remain in the area, with Miller Lake being named after them. The Miller brothers, Philip and John, cleared the land on the east side of Lake Thomas and in 1828 built a dam to power their sawmill, the first in the area. George Taylor, another settler, had come to Fall River in 1829 and was innkeeper of The Lakeside Inn, which was in operation as early as 1831.

In the 1830s, Charles P. Allen operated a water-powered mill on the falls at Miller lake, where he manufactured furniture. The Shubenacadie Canal was operating during the 1850s, and this waterway, which connected Halifax Harbour to the Minas Basin, ran through Fall River by way of the lakes, and the now tumbled-down cut stones of the canal-locks can be still be seen at the meeting of Lake Thomas and Fletcher Lake. Fletcher Lake was named after Robert Fletcher, who operated an inn and way station on the stagecoach road (Cobequid Road) to Truro, at the site of the present day locks, during the 1830s and 1840s. At the north end of Miller Lake stood Rutherfords Inn which operated from the 1840s through to the 1870s. This inn had a rich reputation for entertainment, and was frequented by miners from the nearby gold fields at Waverley and by militia men and parties from Dartmouth.

Around 1902, there was a wooden aqueduct over a mile long, which carried water from Miller Lake along the top of Gunns Mountain to Waverley, where the power from it was used in gold mining in that village. While not on the same scale as nearby Waverley, the only gold diggings in Fall River were mainly located on the east side of Miller Lake in the late 1890s and early 20th century. A few hundred ounces were produced. In the year 1900, the first telephone was installed in Fall River. Charles Carr operated an early post office in his store in the village. It was located on the corner of Fall River Rd and Hwy #2, near the bridge. The store and post office was there as early as 1910-15, and many Carr family descendants still reside in the area.

Through the later part of the 19th century and early 20th century, Fall River was largely a sleepy little village and grew little in population. In 1921 the Lake Thomas Ice Company was in operation in Fall River and continued until about 1948, operated by the Wilson family. In 1926 the Waverley Game Sanctuary was created, surrounding the east side of Miller Lake and containing large tracts of land within the rugged interior east of Soldier Lake. Also in 1926, the Boy Scouts built a summer camp on Lone Cloud Island in Miller Lake, which is still in use today. There was a blacksmith shop operated by the Millers during the 1930s, located on the east side of Lake Thomas, and the old building is still there as late as 2010. The old general store of Neil Miller was a major fixture in the village, dating from October 14, 1952 until 1987.

In 1954 local resident Graeme Stuart, whose family had come to Fall River from Scotland in the mid-19th century, founded Stuart Industries. The metal fabricating business at its peak employed about 100 men and operated in Fall River until about 1982.

== Demographics ==
In the 2021 Census of Population conducted by Statistics Canada, Fall River had a population of 2,474 living in 812 of its 834 total private dwellings, a change of 5.9% from its 2016 population of 2,337. With a land area of 14.89 km^{2} (5.75 sq mi), it had a population density of 166.2/km^{2} (430.3/sq mi) in 2021.

== Growth ==
Lockview High School opened its doors in 2000 to relieve strain on the aging Charles P. Allen High School in Bedford. Fall River also has two elementary schools, Holland Road Elementary School and Ash Lee Jefferson Elementary School. Ash Lee Jefferson Elementary School was named after Mrs. Ada Lee, Mrs. Selena Jefferson and Mrs. Martha Ash, all of whom are remembered for their extraordinary humanitarian efforts, moral and Christian leadership in the community of Fall River. There is also one junior high: Georges P. Vanier. Due to the increased presence of schools and retail, Fall River serves as a hub for neighboring communities.

There are four major subdivisions in Fall River, the first being called The Schwarzwald (named after the famed Black Forest in Germany) and developed by the Miller family in the mid-1970s. Schwarzwald has in the past decade started development of a new section called Schwarzwald Heights, which branches off of Trunk Highway 2. The second subdivision being Fall River Village. Fall River Village was established in 1973 with over 1,000 acres (400 ha) of land and 200 acres (81 ha) yet to be developed. Also Capilano is the third major subdivision, with the Ashburn golf course just outside.

A new fire station and recreation/sports center for Fall River, the Gordon R. Snow Community Centre/Fire Station 45, opened in October 2008. It is named after Gordon R. Snow, a former councillor and resident of the community.

== Waterways ==
There are many lakes in Fall River and its surrounding communities of Wellington, Waverley, Windsor Junction and Lakeview. There is an eighteen-hole golf course, Ashburn Golf Club, and two parks, Laurie Provincial Park and Oakfield Provincial Park.

Lake Thomas and Lake Fletcher in Fall River form a section of the Shubenacadie Canal, which connects the Bay of Fundy with the Halifax Harbour.

Soldier Lake, a large reservoir.

Johnson River, a small river emptying into the east side of Soldier Lake and originating in the rugged interior of the game sanctuary.

Third Lake, the third in a series of lakes starting in Lower Sackville. Third Lake forms part of the western boundary of Fall River

Kinsac Lake, a large lake, part of which forms another section of the western boundary of Fall River

Miller Lake, a reservoir which empties into Lake Thomas. Home to the Miller Lake Dragon of Camp Lone Cloud, a familiar summer sight out in the lake, near Highway 102.

German Creek, a small waterway which flows from the Gunn Ponds, under Perrin Drive into Miller Lake.

== Transportation ==
All-day Halifax Transit service is provided by route 320, which services the Fall River Park and Ride at 49 Falls Run, off Perrin Drive. The route provides direct service to the airport (to the north) and to Dartmouth and Downtown Halifax to the south. The park-and-ride lot has 90 free parking spaces.
