= Halifax Regional Centre for Education =

School district of Halifax Regional Municipality, Nova Scotia, Canada

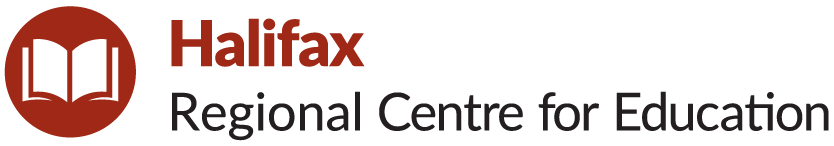

Address
- 33 Spectacle Lake Drive Halifax Regional Municipality Dartmouth, Nova Scotia, B3B 1X7; Canada

District information
- Type: Public
- Grades: PP-12
- Established: 1996
- Closed: January 24, 2018
- Regional Executive Director of Education: Steve Gallagher
- Schools: 137
- Budget: $687 million

Students and staff
- Students: 58,258 (2023–24)
- Staff: 11,000 (approx)

Other information
- Website: hrce.ca

The Halifax Regional Centre for Education (formerly the Halifax Regional School Board) is the public school district responsible for 136 elementary, junior high, and high schools located in the Halifax Regional Municipality. The current Regional Executive Director is Steve Gallagher. The district's office is on Spectacle Lake Drive in Dartmouth. On January 24, 2018, the provincial government announced that the Halifax Regional School Board would be dissolved and that kindergarten to grade 12 education services in Halifax would administered by an appointed provincial council. The Halifax Regional School Board was dissolved on March 31, 2018.

== History ==
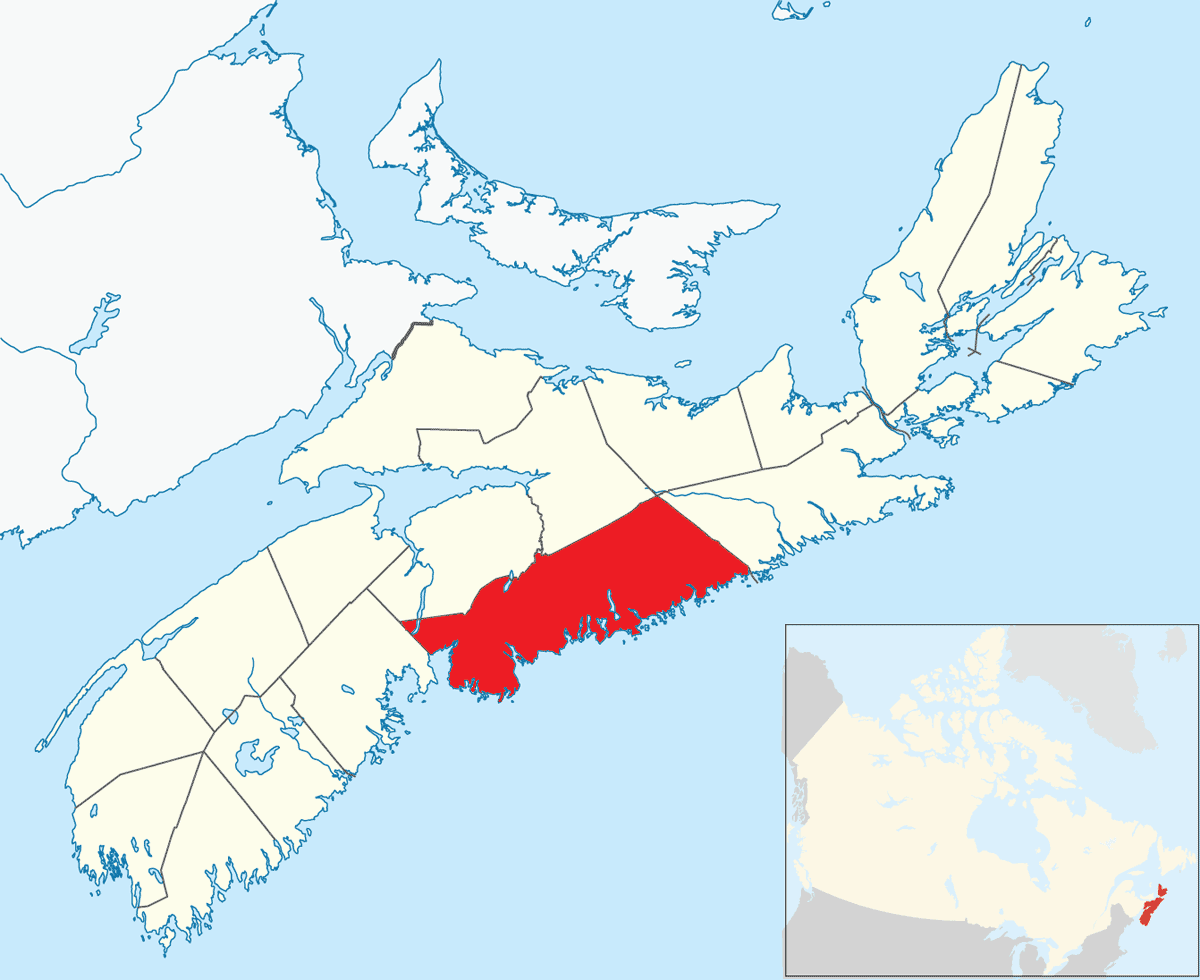
Coverage map of the school board

The Halifax Regional School Board was created in 1996 with the amalgamation of three school boards that had jurisdiction over the former components of the Halifax Regional Municipality, which was created at the same time. Board elections have taken place in 1996, 2000, 2004, 2008 and 2012.

=== 2006 board dismissal ===
On December 19, 2006, the Minister of Education, Karen Casey, dismissed all 13 members of the board due to interpersonal conflicts and having failed to comply with their Code of Ethics. The minister stated, "This board has failed to meet the performance standards set out under Section 64 (6) of the Education Act. Sec. 64 states that a school board, in carrying out its responsibilities under this act, shall meet education program services and performance standards established by the minister." Seven of the former Halifax Regional School Board members are considering legal action against the government for disbanding the elected group.

Howard Windsor, a former deputy minister, was appointed to act as the board until the municipal elections took place in October 2008. Mr. Windsor decided to discontinue their yearly stipends of $8,200, stating: "I respect the work done by the previous board members, but I see no reason to continue to pay them when they have neither the responsibility nor the authority to act on the public’s behalf." Windsor was replaced by a nine-member elected Board during regularly scheduled elections in 2008.

=== 2018 dissolution ===
On January 23, 2018, education consultant Avis Glaze presented a report on the province's school system to government that included the recommendation that the seven elected regional school boards become regional education offices overseen by appointed provincial advisory council. On January 24, 2018, the provincial government announced it accepted the recommendation and the Halifax Regional School Board and six other school boards would be dissolved though no date for dissolution was then announced. The elected school board was dissolved on March 31, 2018.

== Personnel ==
=== Superintendents ===
- Don Trider (1996–1999)
- David Reid (1999–2002)
- Carole Olsen (2002–2012)
- Judy White Interim (2012–2013)
- Elwin LeRoux (2013–2018)

=== Regional Executive Director ===
- Elwin LeRoux (2018–2022)
- Steve Gallagher (Acting) (2022–present)

== Schools ==
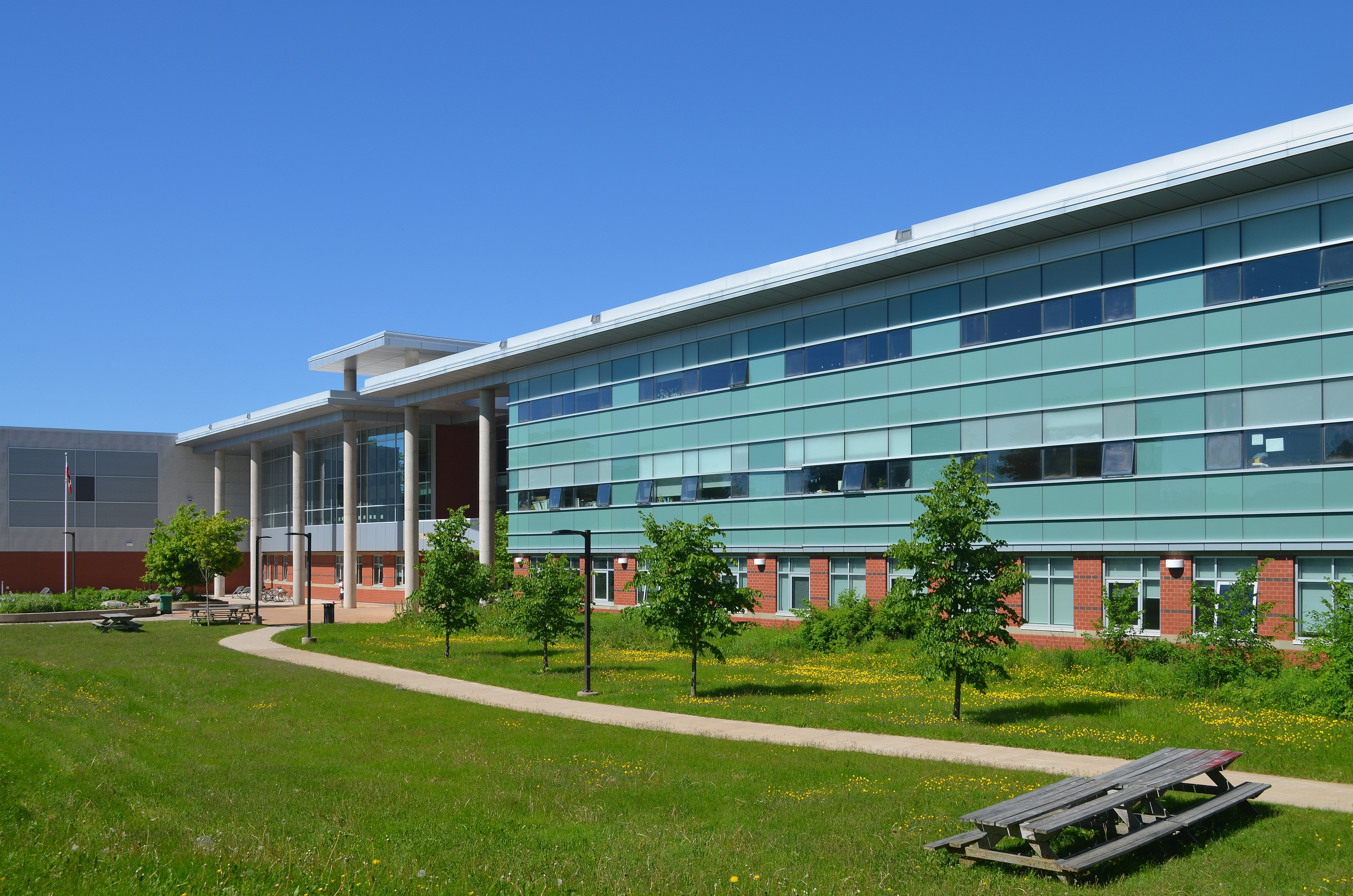
Citadel High School

=== High schools ===
- Auburn Drive High School
- Bay View High School
- Charles P. Allen High School
- Citadel High School (Grades 10–12)
- Cole Harbour District High School
- Dartmouth High School (Grades 9–12)
- Duncan MacMillan High School (Grades Primary-12)
- Eastern Shore District High School
- Halifax West High School
- Island View High School (Grades 9–12)
- J.L. Ilsley High School (Grades 9–12)
- Lockview High School (Grades 9–12)
- Millwood High School (Grades 9–12)
- Musquodoboit Rural High School (Grades 7–12)
- Sackville High School (Grades 9–12)
- Woodlawn High School

=== Junior high schools ===
- Astral Drive Junior High School
- A. J. Smeltzer Junior High School (Grades 6–8)
- Bicentennial School (Grades Primary-9)
- Brookside Junior High (Grades 6–9)
- Caledonia Junior High
- Clayton Park Junior High
- Cunard Junior High (Grades 5–8)
- Eastern Passage Education Centre
- Elizabeth Sutherland School (Grades Primary-8)
- Ellenvale Junior High
- Eric Graves Junior High
- Fairview Junior High
- Five Bridges Junior High (Grades 6–9)
- Gaetz Brook Junior High
- Georges P. Vanier Junior High (Grades 6–8)
- Gorsebrook Junior High School
- Graham Creighton Junior High School
- Halifax Central Junior High (formerly Cornwallis Junior High)
- Harold T. Barrett Junior High (Grades 6–8)
- Herring Cove Junior High (Grades 6–8)
- Highland Park Junior High (Grades 7-9)
- John Martin Junior High
- Leslie Thomas Junior High (Grades 6–8)
- Madeline Symonds Middle School (Grades 6-8)
- Ecole Oxford School|Oxford School (Grades Primary-9)
- Oyster Pond Academy (Grades Primary-9)
- Park West School (Grades Primary-9)
- Prince Arthur Junior High
- Ross Road School (Grades Primary-9)
- Sackville Heights Junior High (Grades 6–8)
- Sir Robert Borden Junior High School
- St. Agnes Junior High
- Rockingstone Heights (Grades Primary-8)
- Rocky Lake Junior High School
- Ridgecliff Middle School (Grades 6–9)
- Highland Park Junior High (Grades 7-9)

== Elementary schools ==
- Admiral Westphal Elementary
- Alderney Elementary
- Ash Lee Jefferson Elementary
- Astral Drive Elementary
- Atlantic Memorial - Terence Bay Elementary (Atlantic Memorial)
- Atlantic Memorial - Terence Bay Elementary (Terence Bay)
- Atlantic View Elementary
- Basinview Drive Community School
- Beaver Bank-Kinsac Elementary
- Beaver Bank-Monarch Drive Elementary
- Bedford South School
- Beechville Lakeside Timberlea Jr Elementary
- Beechville Lakeside Timberlea Sr Elementary
- Bel Ayr Elementary
- Bell Park Academic Centre
- Brookhouse Elementary
- Burton Ettinger Elementary
- Caldwell Road Elementary
- Caudle Park Elementary
- Cavalier Drive School
- Central Spryfield Elementary
- Chebucto Heights Elementary
- Colby Village Elementary
- Colonel John Stuart Elementary
- Crichton Park Elementary
- Duc d'Anville Elementary
- Dutch Settlement Elementary
- East St. Margaret's Elementary
- Fairview Heights Elementary (Annex Building)
- Fairview Heights Elementary (Main Building)
- George Bissett Elementary
- Grosvenor-Wentworth Park Elementary
- Hammonds Plains Consolidated Elementary
- Harbour View Elementary
- Harrietsfield Elementary
- Harry R. Hamilton Elementary
- Hawthorn Elementary
- Hillside Park Elementary
- Holland Road Elementary
- Humber Park Elementary
- Horizon Elementary
- Ian Forsyth Elementary
- Inglis Street Elementary
- John MacNeil Elementary
- John W. MacLeod - Fleming Tower Elem. (Fleming Tower)
- John W. MacLeod - Fleming Tower Elem. (John W. MacLeod)
- Joseph Giles Elementary
- Joseph Howe Elementary
- Kingswood Elementary
- LeMarchant-St. Thomas Elementary
- Michael Wallace Elementary
- Millwood Elementary
- Mount Edward Elementary
- Musquodoboit Valley Education Centre
- Nelson Whynder Elementary
- O'Connell Drive Elementary
- Ocean View Elementary
- Oldfield Consolidated Elementary
- Porters Lake Elementary
- Portland Estates Elementary
- Prospect Road Elementary
- Robert Kemp Turner Elementary
- Rockingham Elementary
- Sackville Heights Elementary
- Saint Mary's Elementary
- Sambro Elementary
- Seaside Elementary
- Shannon Park Elementary
- Shatford Memorial Elementary
- Sir Charles Tupper Elementary
- Smokey Drive Elementary
- South Woodside Elementary
- Springvale Elementary
- St. Catherine's Elementary
- St. Joseph's-Alexander McKay Elementary
- St. Margaret's Bay Elementary
- St. Stephen's Elementary
- Sunnyside Elementary (Eaglewood Drive)
- Sunnyside Elementary (Fort Sackville)
- Sycamore Lane Elementary
- Tantallon Jr Elementary
- Tantallon Sr Elementary
- Upper Musquodoboit Consolidated Elem.
- Waverley Memorial
- Westmount Elementary
- William King Elementary

== See also ==
- Education in Canada
- List of Nova Scotia schools
