= Island View High School =

High school in Eastern Passage, Nova Scotia

Coordinates: 44.6119°N 63.4851°W

Location
- 1853 Caldwell Road; Eastern Passage, Nova Scotia, B3G 1J3; Canada

Information
- School type: Public High school
- Opened: 2018
- School board: Halifax Regional Centre for Education
- Principal: Randolph Sullivan
- Grades: 9–12
- Enrollment: 590 (2024)
- Language: English; French immersion
- Colors: Navy, Green and Gray
- Team name: Devils
- Website: ivh.hrce.ca

Island View High School (IVHS) is a public high school in Eastern Passage, Nova Scotia, Canada. Operated by the Halifax Regional Centre for Education (HRCE), the school serves grades 9–12 and opened in 2018 to provide a local secondary option for the Eastern Passage, Cow Bay and Shearwater communities.

== History ==
In July 2013 the Province of Nova Scotia announced a new high school for Eastern Passage, concluding that building a dedicated facility was the most cost-effective way to serve the area. Ahead of construction, a portion of the Eastern Passage Common property was transferred to the province in 2016 for the school site.

Island View High opened to students in September 2018 and held its official opening on 4 October 2018, with reported initial enrolment of “more than 400” students and a building capacity of about 600. Coverage at the time also noted public debate about whether a new high school was required; Nova Scotia’s auditor general had questioned the project’s need, while the province proceeded and opened the school in 2018. The school marked its first graduating class in 2020.

== Campus and architecture ==
The campus stands on Caldwell Road in Eastern Passage. The facility was designed by EXP, integrating flexible learning spaces and common areas; the project received the 2019 Halifax Mayor’s Prize in Architecture (Institutional Design), recognized by the Nova Scotia Association of Architects.

== Programs and academics ==
IVHS delivers the Nova Scotia high school program in English with a French Immersion stream that continues from Eastern Passage Education Centre. Beginning in September 2024, HRCE lists Island View among schools offering Advanced Placement (AP) courses. The school also runs the provincial Options and Opportunities (O2) career program in its senior high timetable (announced annually to incoming Grade 9 families).

The school issues Chromebooks to students with annual agreements managed through PowerSchool and school forms.

== Enrollment ==
HRCE reports enrolment of 590 students in 2024, with earlier totals of 538 (2019), 577 (2020), 556 (2021), 549 (2022) and 558 (2023).

== Student life and athletics ==
School communications regularly advertise tryouts for interscholastic teams such as soccer, volleyball, baseball, cross-country and others (offerings vary by year). Hockey teams compete locally under the Island View Devils name in the Halifax Metro High School Hockey League (boys) and the Metro High School Girls Hockey League (girls).

== Administration ==
HRCE lists Randolph Sullivan as principal; the school’s profile page also provides contacts and operational details. The school’s own website provides calendars, bell schedules and guidance resources.

== Feeder pattern ==
HRCE places Island View within the Island View Family of Schools. Feeder schools include Eastern Passage Education Centre for junior high and the area elementaries Horizon (formerly Tallahassee), Seaside and Ocean View.

== See also ==
- Education in Nova Scotia
- List of schools in Nova Scotia
