= Bay View High School (Canada) =

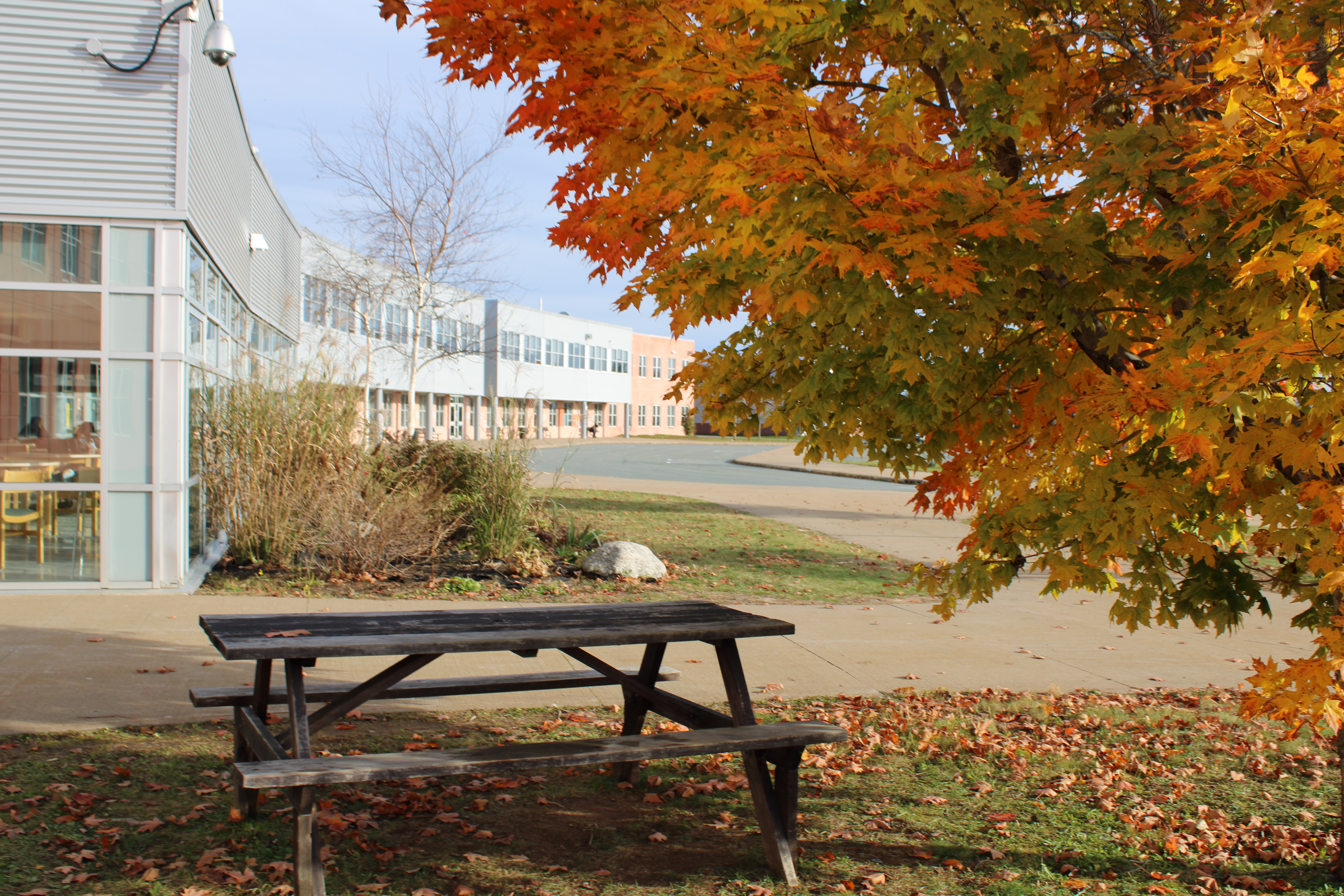
- Bay View High School in 2021

Location
- 31 Scholars Rd. Upper Tantallon, Nova Scotia, B3Z 0C3; Canada; 44°41′53.3″N 63°51′53.8″W

Information
- School type: High School
- Founded: September 1968
- School board: Halifax Regional Centre for Education
- School number: 232
- Principal: Dunovan Kalberlah
- Grades: Grade 10 - Grade 12
- Enrolment: 1,107 (2024)
- Language: English & Late/Early French
- Colours: Red and Blue
- Mascot: Shark
- Team name: Bayview Sharks
- Website: bvh.hrce.ca

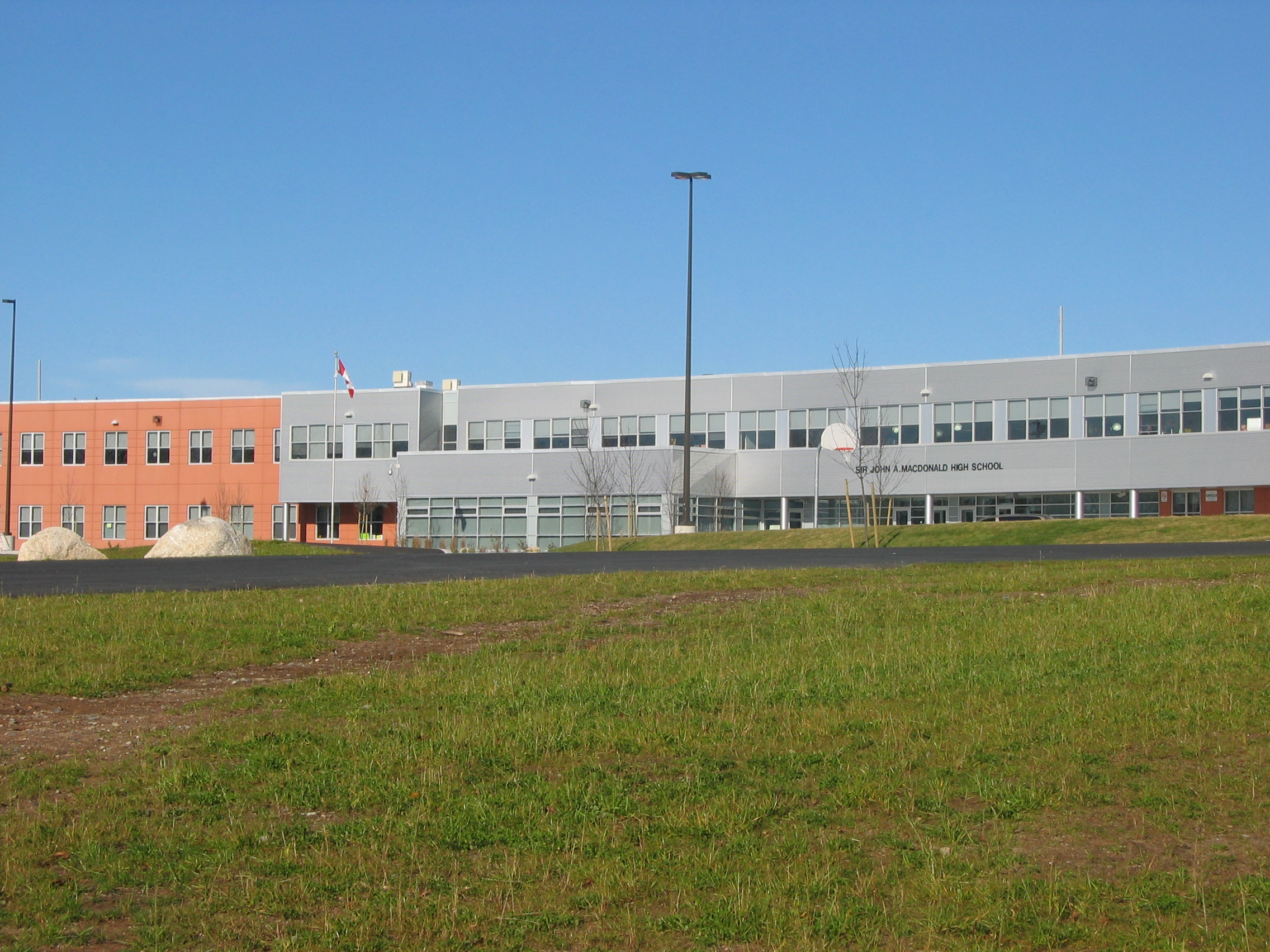
Bay View High School as Sir John A. Macdonald High School in 2006

Bay View High School is a Canadian high school serving the western suburbs of Nova Scotia's Halifax Regional Municipality (HRM); namely the communities of Beechville, Lakeside, Timberlea, Tantallon and communities on the western portion of Highway 333 including Peggy's Cove, Seabright and others. Bay View's feeder schools are Five Bridges Junior High School and Ridgecliff Middle School.

== History ==
=== First location (Hubley) ===
The original school, Sir John A. MacDonald, located in the Halifax County community of Hubley, opened in September 1968. It was built by general contractor McDonald Construction of Bedford.

=== Second location (Upper Tantallon) ===
In 2002, the Nova Scotia Department of Education released an evaluation report as a result of an environmental assessment of the building and grounds. Several potential health and safety concerns were identified which led to the closure of the school. During this time, students were transported to other high schools in the area and a decision was made to construct a new building for the school. The new school is located in Tantallon and completed construction in 2007. The old school was completely renovated and reopened in 2006 as Five Bridges Junior High School.

== Sports ==
As of the 2021-2022 school year, the school mascot was changed to the "Shark". In 2013, the previously known Flames football team went on to beat their rivals the Citadel High Phoenix. One week later they went on to beat the CPA Cheetahs. This was the school's first football championship since being created in 2005.

== Renaming ==
The prior name for the school was "Sir John A. Macdonald High School". In November 2020, school principal Darlene Fitzgerald announced that plans were underway to rename the high school due to concerns over inclusivity and the indigenous history associated with Canada's first Prime Minister. "We need to ensure our future generations feel equal and protected. Our school must be a safe space for all, but a school bearing this name alienates Indigenous students," said Fitzgerald in a statement. In April 2021, the school announced it would formally change its name to "Bay View High School".
