= Lockview High School =

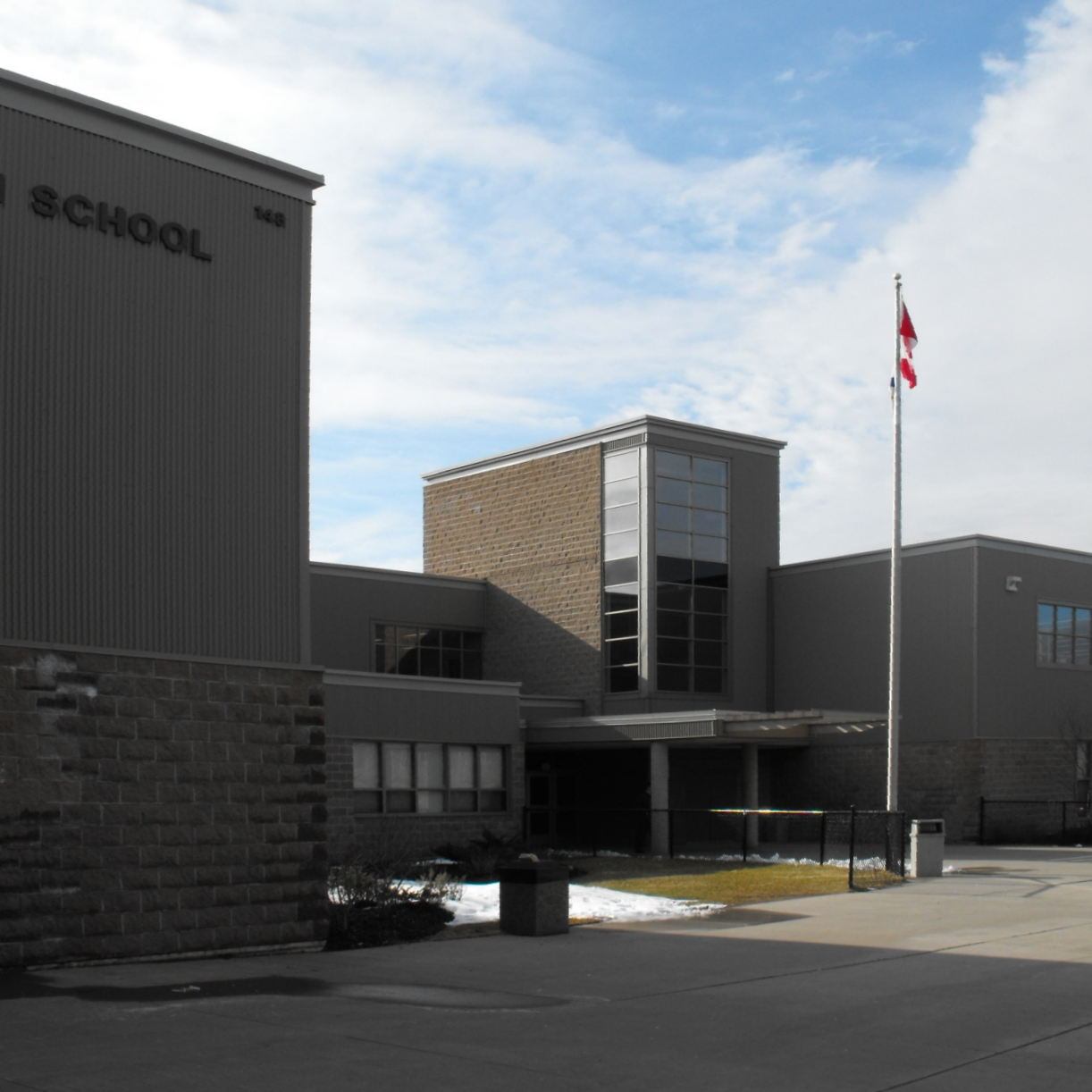

Location
- 148 Lockview Road; Fall River, Nova Scotia, B2T 1J1; Canada; 44.8235°N 63.6196°W

Information
- School type: High school
- School board: Halifax Regional Centre for Education (HRCE)
- Principal: Kelly MacLeod
- Grades: 9–12
- Enrollment: 1,257 (2024)
- Language: English; French Immersion (Early and Late)
- Colours: Blue, black, silver and grey
- Mascot: Miller the Dragon
- Team name: Dragons
- Website: lhs.hrce.ca

Lockview High School is a public secondary school in Fall River, Nova Scotia, operated by the Halifax Regional Centre for Education (HRCE). It serves students in grades 9–12 from Fall River, Beaver Bank, Windsor Junction, Waverley, Wellington and parts of Enfield. The school opened in 2000 to relieve overcrowding at Charles P. Allen High School in Bedford. The building was originally delivered under a public–private partnership and leased from Scotia Learning Centres; in 2016 the Province announced it would exercise purchase options on Lockview and other P-3 schools when leases expired in 2020.

== History ==
Lockview High opened in 2000 on Lockview Road in Fall River. It was one of Nova Scotia's P-3 schools developed and operated by Scotia Learning Centres. In November 2016, the Province began the process to purchase 12 Scotia Learning Centres schools—including Lockview—at lease expiry in 2020, citing long-term affordability and the need to keep the buildings in public use.

A new artificial turf field at the school opened for play in October 2025, with the Dragons hosting the first game at the venue.

== Academic programs ==
Lockview offers English-language programming with both Early and Late French Immersion available in grades 9–12. The school also participates in HRCE's Advanced Placement (AP) program; the regional AP schools list identifies Lockview among participating schools. Course selection information and annual handbooks are published by Student Services.

== Arts and student life ==
The school supports a large music program including concert and jazz bands that perform at school events and in the community. Recent activities include year-end band concerts and a performance trip to Ottawa and Montreal.

Lockview stages annual theatrical productions through its drama program (e.g., Legally Blonde in 2024 and The Addams Family in 2023).

The school also fields an improvisational theatre team that competes in the Canadian Improv Games (Nova Scotia region).

== Athletics ==
Lockview's interscholastic teams compete as the Dragons across fall, winter and spring seasons. Offerings typically include badminton, baseball, basketball, cross-country, football, golf, hockey, field hockey (girls), lacrosse, ringette, rugby, slo-pitch, soccer, ski & snowboard, table tennis, track & field and volleyball, as well as Unified basketball.

The football program won the Nova Scotia Student Athletic Federation Football League (NSSAFFL) Tier 2 championship in 2011 and captured the Division 2 provincial title again in 2023. The school began hosting home games on a new turf field in 2025.

== Feeder schools ==
HRCE lists the following schools in the Lockview Family of Schools: Ash Lee Jefferson Elementary; Beaver Bank–Kinsac Elementary; Beaver Bank–Monarch Drive Elementary; Georges P. Vanier Junior High; Harold T. Barrett Junior High; Holland Road Elementary; Oldfield Consolidated Elementary; and Waverley Memorial Elementary.
