= Eastern Shore District High School =

Former public high school in Musquodoboit Harbour, Nova Scotia, Canada

Location
- 35 West Petpeswick Road; Musquodoboit Harbour, Nova Scotia, B0J 2L0; Canada
- Coordinates: 44.782190°N 63.153224°W

Information
- School type: Public High school
- Motto: Consilio Et Animis (By Wisdom and Courage)
- Founded: 1965
- Closed: February 2025
- School board: Halifax Regional Centre for Education
- Principal: Jen Murray
- Grades: 10–12
- Language: English
- Colours: Blue and gold
- Mascot: Fisherman
- Team name: Schooners
- Website: www.esdh.ednet.ns.ca

Eastern Shore District High School (ESDH) was a public senior high school that served communities east of Dartmouth, Nova Scotia, Canada. Located at Musquodoboit Harbour and operated by the Halifax Regional Centre for Education (HRCE), the school offered grades 10–12 from 1979 onward. In February 2025, students and staff moved into the newly built Eastern Shore Consolidated School (grades 7–12) in East Chezzetcook, and the ESDH building closed.

== History ==
Plans for a modern high school to serve the Eastern Shore culminated in the opening of Eastern Shore District High School in 1965, amid post-war population change in the Musquodoboit Harbour area. In 1979, the opening of Gaetz Brook Junior High reconfigured grade levels in the area; from that point, ESDH taught grades 10–12 while grades 7–9 attended Gaetz Brook.

== Communities served ==
The school’s catchment drew students from communities stretching roughly from Lake Echo through Porters Lake and Chezzetcook to Ship Harbour, as reflected in HRCE attendance boundary maps for junior/senior levels feeding into the high school.

== Academics and student life ==
A 2015–16 HRCE community report for ESDH documents school improvement goals in mathematics and literacy and highlights expanded technology use (e.g., Google Classroom) and a range of wellness and recognition initiatives (including the “Schooner Award”, curriculum-night awards, and an active youth health centre).

=== Extracurricular activities ===
School publications and HRCE communications indicate a long-running slate of extracurriculars. In 2015–16, ESDH reported “lots of extra-curricular activities,” anchor and athletic awards events, and numerous student-led groups. HRCE daily announcements for January 2025 (as the move approached) show senior band rehearsals, musical theatre rehearsals hosted at the ESDH site, and ongoing basketball activities.

== Athletics ==
ESDH teams competed as the Schooners (blue and gold), with teams fielded in sports including basketball, hockey and others over the years. The school’s hockey program is recorded in league materials for the Metro High School Hockey League. Local coverage and team communications also refer to the “Schooners” in tournament and season play.

== Facilities and renovations ==
The ESDH building underwent periodic upgrades. In 2015, HRCE tendered and completed a gym floor replacement at the school. A subsequent building-condition review noted lobby renovations completed around the same period.

== Replacement and closure ==
On 30 April 2018, the provincial capital plan announced the replacement of the ESDH building. A 2022 decision by the Office of the Information and Privacy Commissioner recounts the project’s early history and related records. On 14 October 2021, the Province announced the selected site—within the Eastern Shore Industrial Park at 210 Motts Drive, East Chezzetcook—for the new 7–12 school replacing ESDH and Gaetz Brook Junior High. Following construction delays reported by HRCE, the consolidated school opened to students on 4 February 2025, at which point classes ceased at the ESDH building.

== Publications and archives ==
The Eastern Shore Archives holds ESDH records, including student newspapers and yearbooks (Mariner and others), documenting student life and school history.

== Notable alumni ==
- Stephen Giles — Olympic bronze medallist in canoe sprint (Sydney 2000); recipient list notes his Governor General’s Academic Medal at Eastern Shore District High.
