= Halifax Search and Rescue =

Canadian search and rescue organization

Halifax Regional Search & Rescue
- Abbreviation: HRSAR
- Formation: 1972
- Type: Non-profit organization
- Location: 116 Lakeview Rd, Halifax, NS
- Coordinates: 44.767921°N 63.628379°W
- Volunteers: 170
- Website: halifaxsar.ca

Halifax Regional Search and Rescue is a non-profit volunteer organization dedicated to ground search and rescue primarily within Halifax Regional Municipality, Nova Scotia, Canada. It consists of a team of approximately 200 volunteers who respond 24/7 to lost person incidents, wilderness rescues, civil emergencies, and evacuations.

== Early history ==
In the winter of 1969 two children became lost in woods in the Spryfield area during a major winter storm. A dedicated and trained search and rescue team did not exist at the time; so searching was the responsibility of the community and the police department. By the time the storm was over, one of the children and one of the searchers had died of exposure. This event lead to the formation of Waverly Ground Search and Rescue, the first such dedicated organization in the region. The organization would later go on to become Halifax Regional Search and Rescue.

== Operations ==
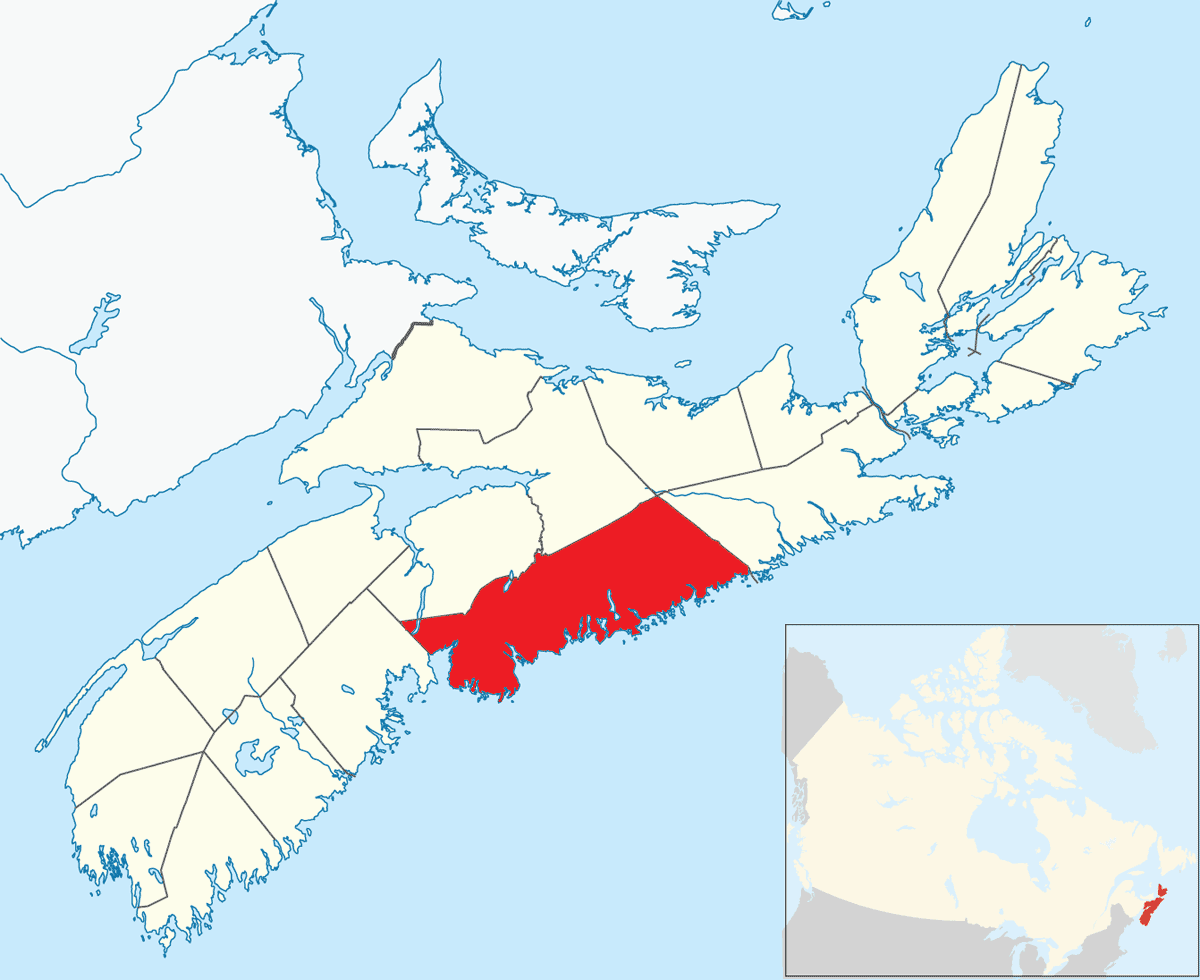
Primary jurisdiction of HRSAR

The organization's primary operating area is within the Halifax Regional Municipality. However due to the team's expertise and resources, the organization may be called to lead search and rescue operations within the province, and is routinely called to provide mutual aid support and relief for other teams in the Maritime provinces.

Over 90% of the team's operations are funded by the community through local fund-raising activities and a grant from HRM Fire and Emergency Services. Team members are entirely volunteers, are not paid, and provide their own clothing and equipment.

In 2013 the organization responded to 24 calls, including missing person searches, rescues, and police evidence searches.

In addition to emergency response, the organization has a significant involvement in wilderness survival training for children and adults. The children's program is named "hug-a-tree," and teaches elementary school children what to do if they are lost in the woods. Since its inception, the team has educated over 75,000 children and adults.

The team conducts meetings and training every Monday evening, with additional training events occurring on weekends. All volunteers must pass a security check, complete core training, and a one-year probationary period.

== Notable incidents ==
=== Andy Warburton search ===
On July 1, 1986, a nine-year-old boy wandered into the woods near the Beaverbank area and become lost. A frantic search was launched, which grew to become the largest ground search in Canadian history, involving over 5,000 volunteers. After eight days, the boy was located deceased. This tragic outcome was the impetus for change, which resulted in a revolution in ground search and rescue techniques. In addition to the advent of specialized search training and techniques, the then Waverley Ground Search and Rescue partnered with Kenneth Hill a Saint Mary's University child psychologist to research and profile lost person behaviour. This research was published and become a fundamental component of how ground searches are carried out.

=== Swiss Air Flight 111 ===
On September 3, 1998, the organization undertook the largest mutual aid search operation in Nova Scotia's history. With the crash of Swissair Flight 111 off the coast of Nova Scotia, Halifax Regional Search and Rescue was charged with primary responsibility for all ground operations including military operations and other ground SAR teams. On November 5, 1998, 64 days later, volunteers had contributed 48,780 hours with 3,141 person days.

=== James Delorey search ===
On December 5, 2009, a seven-year-old non-verbal autistic boy wandered away from his Cape Breton home with his family dog in winter conditions. He was not wearing outdoor clothing. An urgent search was launched by local search and rescue teams, with the Halifax Regional Search and Rescue team later called in to assist as a backup. Upon arriving in storm conditions on December 7, members from the Halifax team traced tracks left by Delorey's dog, and subsequently located the missing child alive but unconscious and suffering from severe hypothermia. Delorey was airlifted to the IWK children's hospital in Halifax, where he died the following day.

=== Garage fire ===
On January 9, 2013, a major fire at the team's base resulted in the destruction of one of their vehicles, and damage to other vehicles and the garage that housed them. The replacement cost of the lost vehicle alone was estimated to be $100,000, which exceeded the team's entire annual funding. Repair costs for the remaining vehicles and building were additional.

=== Marty Leger search ===
On May 29, 2014, a 30-year-old mountain biker on the Spider Lake trails in Waverley, Nova Scotia failed to return from an afternoon ride. That evening Halifax Regional Search and Rescue was brought in by the RCMP to assist in locating him. The search area covered 80 square kilometres of exceptionally dense and rugged terrain. After five days of continuous searching involving numerous helicopters, boats, 450 search and rescue members from teams from as far away as New Brunswick and Prince Edward Island, and 250 army members from CFB Gagetown, the search was called off. He was never located, and remains an RCMP missing person case.
