= Rocky Lake (Nova Scotia) =

There are many lakes named Rocky Lake in Nova Scotia, Canada.

== Annapolis County ==
- Rocky Lake at 44°33′22″N 65°15′44″W
- Rocky Lake at 44°44′23″N 64°53′26″W

== Municipalite Argyle Municipality ==
- Rocky Lake at 44°1′36″N 65°35′28″W

== Cape Breton Regional Municipality ==
- Rocky Lake at45°48′8″N 60°7′53″W

== Municipality of Clare ==
- Rocky Lake at 44°10′42″N 65°58′51″W

== Municipality of the District of Chester ==
- Rocky Lake at 44°33′6″N 64°5′22″W
- Rocky Lake at 44°39′58″N 64°15′43″W
- Rocky Lake at 44°33′40″N 64°26′14″W

== Colchester County ==
- Rocky Lake at 45°34′11″N 63°24′45″W

== Guysborough County ==
- Rocky Lake at 45°31′15″N 61°40′22″W
- Rocky Lake at 45°25′22″N 61°34′41″W
- Rocky Lake at 45°19′41″N 61°37′3″W
- Rocky Lake at 45°31′15″N 61°40′22″W
- Rocky Lake at 45°19′41″N 61°37′3″W
- Rocky Lake at 45°18′4″N 61°21′20″W
- Rocky Lake at 45°17′1″N 61°16′5″W
- Rocky Lake at 45°13′31″N 61°25′24″W
- Rocky Lake at 45°13′17″N 61°9′19″W
- Rocky Lake at 45°10′43″N 61°23′51″W
- Rocky Lakes at 45°12′33″N 61°36′58″W
- Rocky Lakes at 45°18′44″N 61°16′55″W

== Municipality of East Hants ==
- Rocky Lake at 45°1′59″N 63°45′34″W
- Rocky Lake at 44°59′34″N 63°39′1″W

== Halifax Regional Municipality ==
- Rocky Lake at 45°4′3″N 62°37′19″W
- Rocky Lake at45°2′33″N 62°54′28″W
- Rocky Lake at44°58′33″N 62°34′48″W
- Rocky Lake at 44°58′2″N 62°55′17″W
- Rocky Lake at 44°55′17″N 63°38′19″W
- Rocky Lake at 44°55′3″N 63°6′18″W
- Rocky Lake at 44°50′23″N 63°5′5″W
- Rocky Lake at 44°50′20″N 62°55′5″W
- Rocky Lake at 44°48′45″N 63°32′14″W
- Rocky Lake at45°2′16″N 62°49′50″W
- Rocky Lake at44°58′30″N 63°4′46″W
- Rocky Lake at44°42′54″N 63°21′2″W
- Rocky Lake at44°54′17″N 62°35′50″W
- Rocky Lake at44°52′47″N 63°18′14″W
- Rocky Lake at44°53′24″N 63°10′46″W
- Rocky Lake at44°51′18″N 63°23′52″W
- Rocky Lake at44°51′32″N 63°8′54″W
- Rocky Lake at44°48′32″N 63°1′49″W
- Rocky Lake at44°47′20″N 63°19′40″W
- Rocky Lake at44°45′36″N 63°37′14″W in Bedford
- Rocky Lake at 44°43′39″N 64°5′32″W

== Lunenburg County ==
- Rocky Lake at 44°28′50″N 64°43′33″W
- Rocky Lake at 44°16′4″N 64°37′35″W
- Rocky Lake at 44°11′27″N 64°31′35″W
- Rocky Lake at 44°29′55″N 64°51′52″W
- Rocky Lake at 44°33′22″N 64°34′48″W

== Richmond County ==
- Rocky Lake at 45°42′48″N 60°58′29″W

== Municipality of the District of St. Mary's ==
- Rocky Lake at 45°9′0″N 61°45′49″W
- Rocky Lake at 45°7′49″N 61°56′58″W
- Rocky Lake at 45°13′14″N 61°56′27″W
- Rocky Lake at 45°3′9″N 62°4′12″W

== See also ==
Geography of Nova Scotia
