= Charles P. Allen High School =

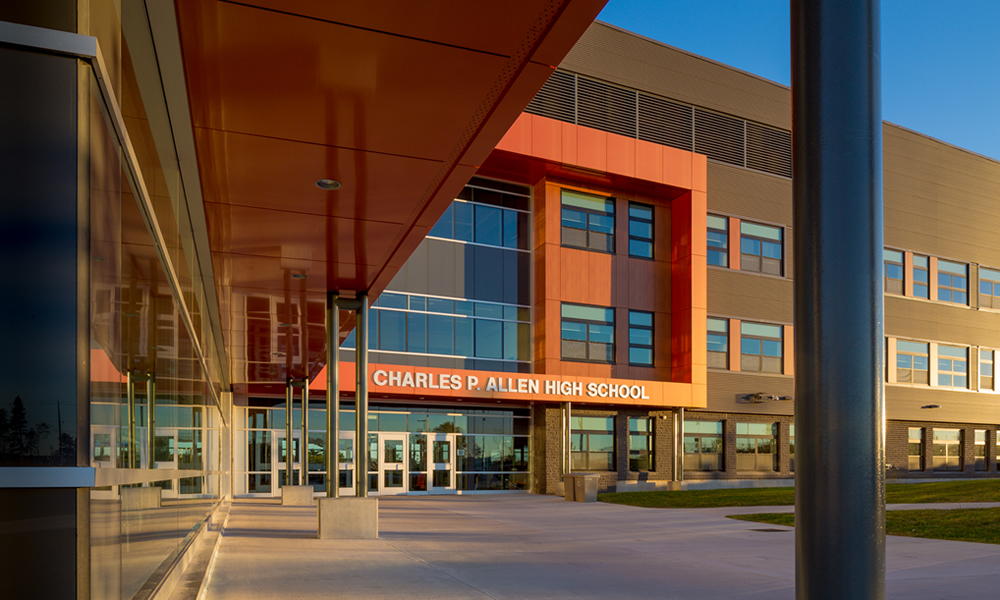

Location
- 200 Innovation Drive; Bedford, Nova Scotia, B4B 0G4; Canada; 44°44′49″N 63°38′18″W

Information
- School type: High school
- Motto: "Striving for Excellence"
- School board: Halifax Regional School Board
- School number: HRSB ID:183; Nova Scotia ID:358
- Principal: Andrea Doucette
- Grades: 10-12
- Enrolment: 1,703 (2026-2027)
- Language: English, French immersion
- Area: 142000 sq ft
- Colours: Blue and White
- Athletics: Yes
- Athletics conference: Nova Scotia School Athletic Federation
- Mascot: Charles
- Team name: Cheetahs
- Accreditation: IB World School
- Website: cpa.hrce.ca

Charles P. Allen High School (CPA) is a senior high school located in Bedford, Nova Scotia, Canada.

This school serves Hammonds Plains, Bedford and a section of Halifax since 2010; for three years at the original CPA and current location since 2013. It serviced Waverley, Fall River, Windsor Junction and Montague Gold Mines until 2000 when Lockview High School was opened. In 2009, CPA ranked 2nd with a grade of A− on the AIMS list.

The school is one of only five schools in HRM that offers the International Baccalaureate Programme; a two-year, internationally standardised university-prep program. CPA also offers the O_{2} program, a three-year program that is unique to Nova Scotia public schools.

As of 2023, the school has an enrolment of 1,823, making it the largest high school in Nova Scotia by enrollment.

== History ==
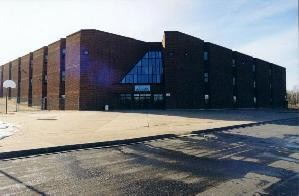
Old Charles P. Allen building, now Rocky Lake Junior High at 670 Rocky Lake Drive

The high school first opened in 1978.

=== Relocation of school ===
In April 2009, the Minister of Education announced a new high school would be built in Bedford to replace Charles P. Allen High School (The campus later became one of its feeder schools, Rocky Lake Junior High School). The new Charles P. Allen opened in September 2013. The new building is located at 200 Innovation Drive in Bedford. The building features an enhanced cafetorium, student lounge, over 50 learning spaces and 2 gymnasiums, one of which is part of the community centre in the building. Outside the school, there is a full-size artificial turf sports field with stadium lighting. The building is built to be energy efficient and meets LEED Gold specifications.

=== 2023 stabbing spree ===
On March 20, 2023, a 15-year-old student facing disciplinary action for posting "anti-furry posters" around the school used a folding knife and at least three other knives to stab the principal and an administrative assistant inside their offices, then deliberately cut his own neck before being taken into custody.

== School teams ==
CPA has teams that participate in:

- Football
- Golf
- Baseball
- Soccer (male and female teams)
- Cross country running
- Volleyball (male and female teams)
- Basketball (male and female; A and B teams)
- Ice hockey (male and female teams)
- Field hockey
- Skiing
- Snowboarding
- Badminton
- Rugby (male and female teams)
- Softball (male and female teams)
- Track & field
- Karate
- Computer programming
- Robotics
- Curling (male, female, mixed)
- Ultimate disc (co-ed; A and B teams)
- Chess club (mixed)
- Pickleball (senior only)
- Lacrosse (male and female teams)

All of the schools sports teams are called the "Cheetahs". C. P. Allen High is a member of the Nova Scotia School Athletic Federation.

== Mascot and school colours ==
The mascot of Charles P. Allen High is the cheetah. In the new building, there is a large student-made cheetah mosaic on the floor of the main hallway. The school's team colours are white and navy blue.

== The International Baccalaureate Programme ==
Charles P. Allen has been an IB World School since 2007. IB Students at Charles P. Allen can take courses that include English HL/SL, French B HL, French B SL, Spanish B ab initio, Economics HL/SL, Environmental Systems & Societies SL, History HL/SL, History SL (available only in French), Biology HL/SL, Chemistry HL/SL, Physics HL/SL, Math Studies SL, Mathematics SL, Theatre HL/SL, Music HL/SL, Visual Arts HL/SL & Theory of Knowledge. The IB Diploma Prep (DP)/Pre-IB is also available for Grade Ten students.

== Enrolment history ==
School population over time as of September 30 of each year

== See also ==
- List of schools in Nova Scotia
