= Jack Woolley =

Jack Woolley may refer to:

- Jack Woolley (footballer)
- Jack Woolley (taekwondo)
- Jack Woolley (The Archers)

== See also ==
- John Woolley (disambiguation)
