= Woolley =

Woolley may refer to:

== Places ==
=== England ===
- Woolley, Cambridgeshire, a hamlet
- Woolley, Cornwall
- Woolley, Derbyshire
- Woolley, Somerset
- Woolley, West Yorkshire, near Wakefield and Barnsley
- Woolley, Wiltshire
- Woolley Colliery, South Yorkshire
- Woolley Hall, a country house in West Yorkshire
- Woolley, a street and area in Bradford-on-Avon, Wiltshire

=== Canada ===
- Mount Woolley, a mountain in Alberta

== People and fictional characters ==
- Woolley (surname)

== See also ==
- Wooley (disambiguation)
- Woolly
