= Woolley (surname) =

Woolley is a surname. Notable people with the surname include:

== People ==
- Albert Woolley (footballer), English footballer
- Alma S. Woolley, American nurse, educator, historian and author
- Bennie L. Woolley, Jr., American trainer of racing horses
- Benjamin Woolley, author, media journalist, television presenter
- Bruce Woolley (born 1953), English writer, performer and record producer
- Cam Woolley, Ontario Provincial Police officer
- Claud Woolley, English cricketer
- Edmund Woolley, early American architect and master carpenter
- Édouard Woolley, Canadian tenor, actor and composer
- Edwin D. Woolley, elected to the Utah Territorial Legislature
- Emmeline M. D. Woolley (1843–1908), English-born Australian musician
- Frank Woolley (1887–1978), English cricketer
- Geoffrey Harold Woolley, British Victoria Cross recipient
- George Cathcart Woolley, British colonial administrator and ethnographer
- Hannah Woolley, early English writer of household management books
- Harold Woolley, Baron Woolley, British farmer and life peer
- Harry George Woolley, Canadian Lacrosse player and advocate
- Helen Thompson Woolley (1874–1947), psychologist and behavioural researcher
- Jack Woolley (born 1998) Irish taekwondo athlete
- James Woolley (1966–2016), keyboard player for the group Nine Inch Nails
- Janet McCarter Woolley (1906–1996), American bacteriologist
- Jason Woolley, Canadian ice hockey defenseman
- John Woolley (disambiguation)
- Jordan Woolley, American actor
- Joseph Woolley, fellow of the Royal Astronomical Society
- Leonard Woolley (1880–1960), British archaeologist
- Lorin C. Woolley, leader in the LDS (Mormon) Fundamentalist Movement
- Ken Woolley (1933–2015), Australian architect
- Mary Emma Woolley, American educator, peace activist, and women's suffrage supporter
- Monty Woolley (1888–1963), American actor
- Patrick Woolley, American lawyer
- Persia Woolley, historical novelist
- Richard van der Riet Woolley, British astronomer
- Rob Woolley (born 1990), English first-class cricketer
- Robert W. Woolley, director of the US Mint and member of the Democratic Party
- Roger Woolley, Tasmanian and Australian cricketer
- Sarah Woolley (born 1987), British trade union leader
- Sarah M. N. Woolley, American neuroscientist
- Shawn Woolley, suicidal Everquest player
- Stephen Woolley, English film producer and director
- William Woolley, member of the National Liberal Party in the UK

== Fictional characters ==
- Bernard Woolley, a main character in the British television series Yes Minister and Yes, Prime Minister
