= Michigan State Spartans men's ice hockey =

Ice hockey team

- Current season
- University: Michigan State University
- Conference: Big Ten
- First season: 1921–22
- Head coach: Adam Nightingale; 4th season, 69–35–9 (.650)
- Assistant coaches: Jared DeMichiel; Mike Towns
- Arena: Munn Ice Arena; East Lansing, Michigan
- Colors: Green and White
- Fight song: Victory for MSU

NCAA tournament champions
- 1966, 1986, 2007

NCAA tournament runner-up
- 1959, 1987

NCAA tournament Frozen Four
- 1959, 1966, 1967, 1984, 1986, 1987, 1989, 1992, 1999, 2001, 2007

NCAA tournament appearances
- 1959, 1966, 1967, 1982, 1983, 1984, 1985, 1986, 1987, 1988, 1989, 1990, 1992, 1994, 1995, 1996, 1997, 1998, 1999, 2000, 2001, 2002, 2004, 2006, 2007, 2008, 2012, 2024, 2025, 2026

Conference tournament champions
- WCHA: 1966, 1967; CCHA: 1982, 1983, 1984, 1985, 1987, 1989, 1990, 1998, 2000, 2001, 2006; Big Ten: 2024, 2025

Conference regular season champions
- CCHA: 1985, 1986, 1989, 1990, 1998, 1999, 2001; Big Ten: 1959, 1967, 1971, 1973, 1976, 2024, 2025, 2026 (Note: Despite their members belonging to other conferences, the Big Ten still awarded regular season conference championships from 1923 to 1943 and 1959 to 1981, and held a conference tournament from 1967 to 1969. In 2013, the Big Ten began officially sponsoring hockey again.)

Current uniform
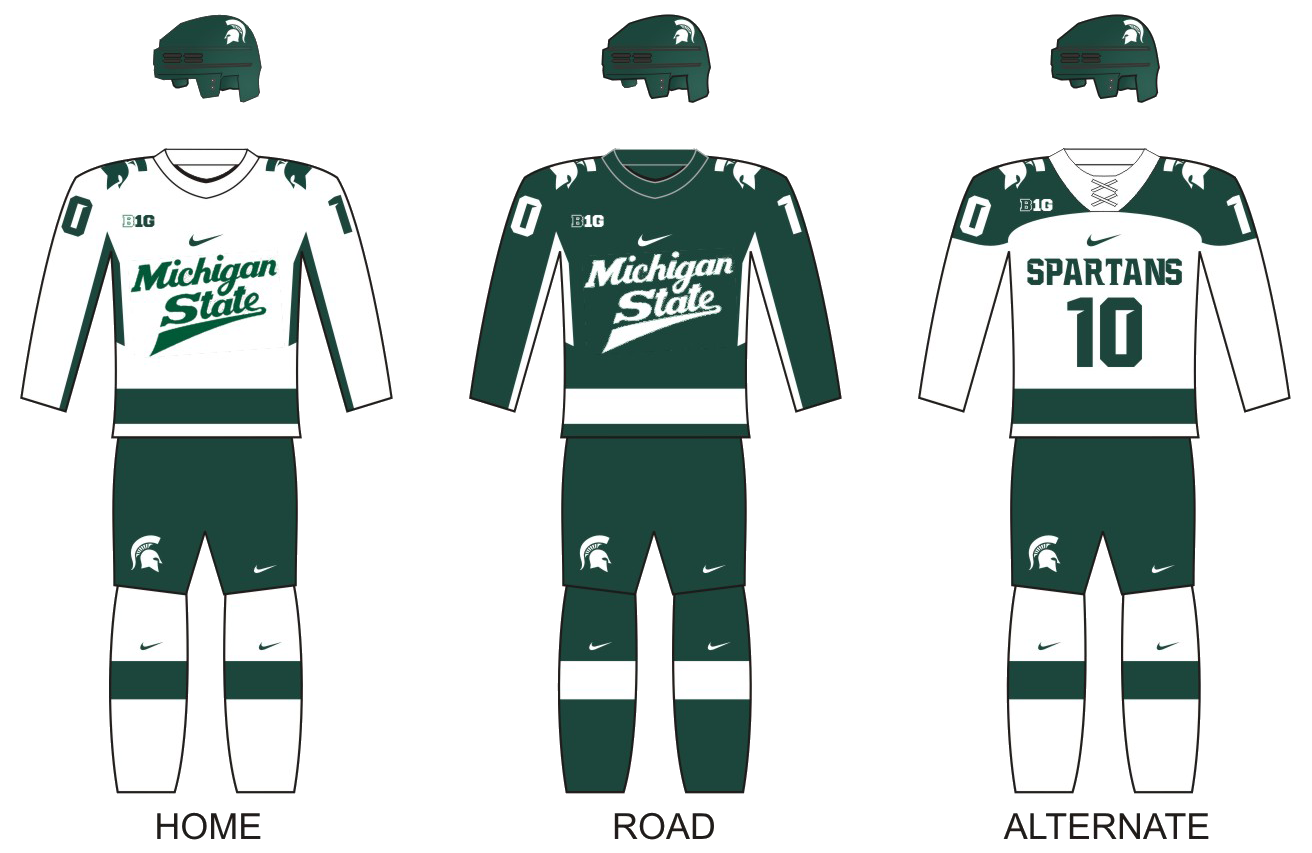

The Michigan State Spartans men's ice hockey team is the college ice hockey team that represents Michigan State University (MSU). The team plays at Munn Ice Arena in East Lansing, Michigan, on the MSU campus. The Spartans have won the NCAA national championship three times (1966, 1986, and 2007). The current head coach is Adam Nightingale, who took over coaching duties on May 3, 2022, after Danton Cole was fired. Michigan State currently competes in the Big Ten Conference after previously being a member of the Central Collegiate Hockey Association.

The Spartans ice hockey program has seven CCHA regular season championships, 11 CCHA Tournament titles, two Big Ten regular season championships, and two Big Ten tournament titles. Michigan State has also won 12 Great Lakes Invitational titles, three ACHA Division 2 titles and one ACHA Division 3 title. The Spartans have been in the NCAA tournament 25 times, with nine Frozen Four appearances. On April 7, 2007, the Michigan State Spartans won their third national championship by beating Boston College 3–1. Their traditional rival is Michigan and the teams have played an annual game in Detroit since 1990. Starting at Joe Louis Arena, the game has since moved to Little Caesars Arena in 2018.

== History ==
=== Early history ===
The Spartan ice hockey program traces its roots back to the first informal varsity team that began in 1922 playing an independent NCAA Division I schedule. On January 11, 1922, Michigan State played its first intercollegiate hockey game, a 5-1 loss to Michigan. Home games during the first season were played on the frozen Red Cedar River on MSU's campus.

Michigan State finished 0–3 in the 1922 season and picked up its first win during the second season on February 11, 1923, 6–1 over the Lansing Independents. The team did not play the 1923–24 season but returned for the 1924–25 season. The 1924–25 season marked the first time the program had a head coach, John Kobs, who also coached the Michigan State Spartans baseball team. Kobs' tenure at Michigan State lasted six season before the team was suspended for 19 seasons. During which time the team compiled a record of 8-18-1.

Harold Paulsen was hired as the varsity ice hockey coach at Michigan State on August 1, 1948 following the suspension of the hockey programs during the years of the Great Depression and World War II. Before recruiting or coaching, Paulsen oversaw the renovation of Demonstration Hall into an indoor rink with artificial ice-making capabilities. On January 12, 1950, MSU played its first game since 1930, losing to Michigan Tech 6–2. Paulsen struggled through his first two years at Michigan State with a 6–25 record. MSU athletic director Ralph Young felt the hockey program's progress was inadequate and Paulsen resigned. Following the 1951 season, Amo Bessone accepted the head coaching position at Michigan State University. Bessone would remain at MSU for the next 28 years.

In the 1958–59 season Michigan State, Minnesota, and Michigan formed their own ice hockey division due to the dissolution of the WIHL. Michigan State won it with a record of 5–2–1 in the division play.

=== Amo Bessone era ===
When Bessone arrived at Michigan State, the ice hockey program was beginning its third full season after being reinstated. That same season, in 1951–52, the Spartans joined Colorado College, Denver, Michigan, Michigan Tech, Minnesota, and North Dakota as founding members of the Midwest Collegiate Hockey League (MCHL).

Amo Bessone won his first collegiate hockey game as head coach on November 29, 1951, when the Spartans defeated Ontario Agricultural College 8–2. The Spartans struggled with six losing seasons before Bessone turned things around in his seventh season as coach. In 1957–58, Michigan State enjoyed its first winning season. The following season, Bessone guided MSU to a Big Ten championship and a berth in the NCAA tournament. The tournament was MSU's first NCAA tournament appearance. The Spartans defeated Boston College 4–3 in the semifinals and advanced to the schools's first championship appearance. The Spartans lost the 1959 national championship game in overtime 3–4 to North Dakota. MSU finishes the season 17-6-1. Michigan State became a charter member of the Western Collegiate Hockey Association (WCHA) in 1959. The WCHA was a reincarnation of the loosely affiliated Midwest Collegiate Hockey League and Western Intercollegiate Hockey League that disbanded following the 1957–58 season. Bessone and MSU struggled during the first five seasons of the WCHA. Again, Bessone turned things around with a winning season in 1964–65. The following season, Bessone coached Michigan State to an improbable NCAA National Championship.

MSU began the 1965–66 season 4-10, but rebounded winning 12 of their last 15 games including defeating the defending national champion, Michigan Tech, to win the WCHA playoffs after finishing sixth in the regular season. The win earned MSU a spot in the 1966 NCAA tournament. In the national semifinals, Bessone upset highly favored Boston University 2–1 with a goal by Spartan forward, Doug Volmar. In the national championship game, Bessone and the Spartans faced Len Ceglarski's Clarkson team that owned the national-best record of 24–2. On March 19, 1966, Michigan State beat top-ranked Clarkson 6–1 victory to give Michigan State is first national championship. Len Ceglarski and Amo Bessone shared the Spencer Penrose Award as the national coach of the year in 1966. The national title and coaching award cemented Bessone's legacy as a coach. To this day, Bessone's 1966 Michigan State team remains one of the biggest underdog stories in NCAA ice hockey history. The total number of team victories (16) and team winning percentage (.551) is the lowest of any NCAA ice hockey champion. MSU made the NCAA tournament again with a strong WCHA playoff finish in 1967, but lost 2–4 in the national semifinals, a rematch of the 1966 NCAA Tournament against Boston University.

Bessone began the 1970s with six straight winning seasons. During Bessone's time coaching the Spartans the team won MSU won its first Great Lakes Invitational by defeating Michigan Tech 5–4 on December 28, 1973.

As MSU hockey was building momentum, Munn Ice Arena opened October 25, 1974, when Michigan State hosted Laurentian. That same season saw the first sellout crowd in Munn's history when the Spartans defeated North Dakota 6–2. A season later, in 1975–76, Bessone guided MSU to its best WCHA conference record of 20-12-0 before Minnesota knocked MSU out of the WCHA playoffs in 6-7 triple overtime loss. Minnesota, who had finished below Michigan State in the conference, received an NCAA tournament bid instead. Bessone announced his retirement effective at the end of the 1978–79 season after three straight losing seasons. Bessone coached his final game as head coach on March 3, 1979, when the Spartans defeated rival Michigan 5–3.

=== Ron Mason era ===
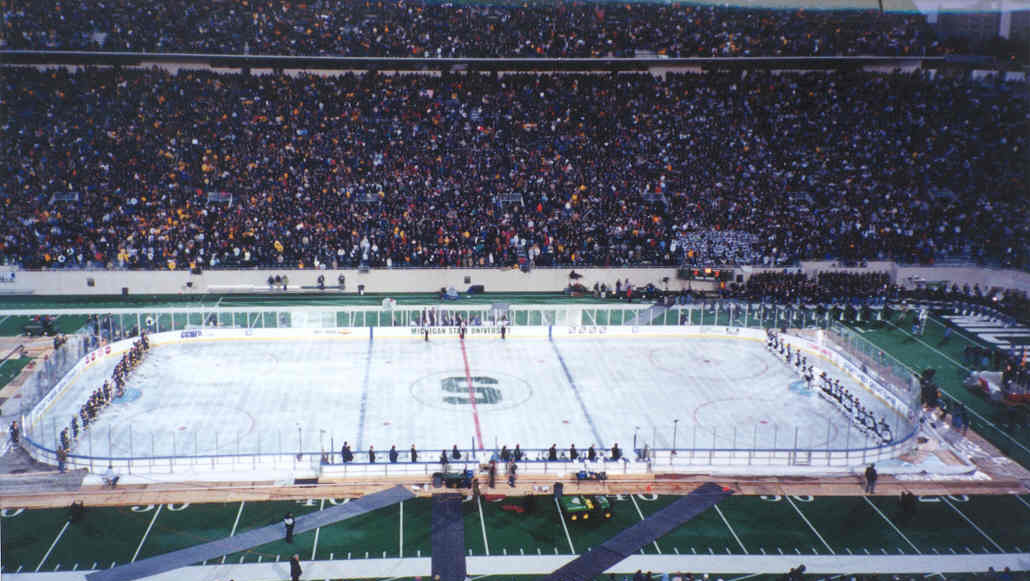
"The Cold War"

After Amo Bessone retired from Michigan State University, the MSU Athletic Director, Joseph Kearney, hired Ron Mason as the Spartans new head coach. Mason was named Spartan head coach on April 1, 1979, and spend the next 23 seasons at Michigan State. It was a rough start in the Western Collegiate Hockey Association for Mason as he compiled a record of 26-46-2 over two seasons. Michigan State joined the Central Collegiate Hockey Association (CCHA) in 1981 and over the next few seasons Mason turned the hockey program around. The Spartans won CCHA playoff championships the first four straight seasons of the conference in 1982, 1983, 1984, 1985. MSU would win a second national title in 1986 when the Spartans defeated Harvard 6–5.

In 2000 CCHA coaches and athletic directors unanimous voted to renamed the CCHA championship trophy to the Mason Cup in honor of Ron Mason, who was a key figure in establishing the conference in the early 1970s prior to his tenure at Michigan State. During the 2000–01 season Michigan State finished first in the regular season and advanced through the CCHA Tournament winning the first ever Mason Cup. That same season the Spartans made a Frozen Four appearance by beating Wisconsin 5-1 before losing to North Dakota in the Semifinal game. On October 6, 2001, the Spartans hosted an outdoor game at Spartan Stadium against rival Michigan known as The Cold War. The school would set an attendance record for an outdoor hockey game as 74,554 fans attended. The game ended in a 3–3 tie.

Mason led Michigan State to seven CCHA regular season titles and a conference-record 10 CCHA tournament titles. In addition, MSU under Mason made 19 NCAA tournament appearances during his 23 seasons with the Spartans. He coached MSU to five NCAA Frozen Fours, two National Championship appearances, and one National Championship. Mason coached two Hobey Baker Memorial Award winners, Kip Miller in 1990 and Ryan Miller in 2001.

=== Rick Comley era ===
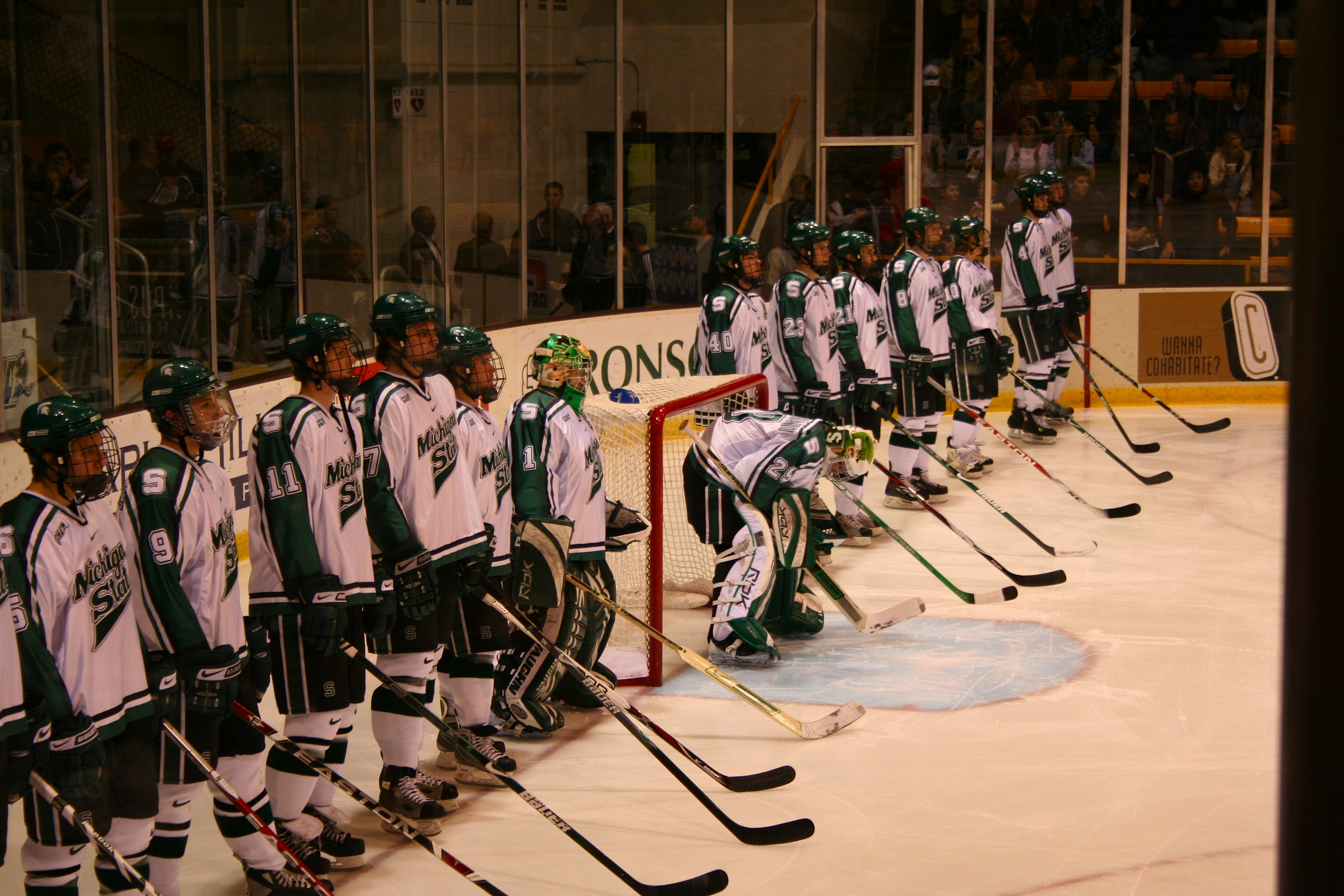
Michigan State Spartans men's ice hockey team in 2008

Rick Comley was announced as Ron Mason's successor as head ice hockey coach at Michigan State University in March 2002. Comley led the Spartans to a tournament appearance in 2004, his second season as MSU's head coach. After losing to Northern Michigan in the 2004 CCHA Tournament the Spartans received an at-large bid to the 2004 NCAA Tournament. Third ranked MSU fell to second seed Minnesota-Duluth in the opening round 0–5.

Comley's Spartans returned to the NCAA Tournament in 2006 after missing the NCAA Tournament in 2005. Comley guided MSU to a second-place CCHA finish in the regular season and a CCHA Mason Cup championship in 2006. Michigan State advanced into the 2006 Tournament with an automatic bid. The Spartans defeated New Hampshire 1-0 before losing to Maine 4–5 in the East Regional Final.

In the 2006–07 season, Michigan State was preseason ranked No. 5, which was MSU's highest preseason ranking since October 2001. The team earned an NCAA Tournament bid after finishing the regular season with a conference record of 15-10-3. Comley led MSU to defeat three higher-ranked teams en route to the national championship including No. 1-ranked Notre Dame in the Midwest Regional final. In the Frozen Four the team defeated No. 4-ranked Boston College in the national championship game on April 7, 2007, by a score of 3–1 in a game that saw Michigan State score three unanswered goals in the third period.

In December 2010 the Michigan State Spartans and Michigan Wolverines played a second outdoor game at Michigan Stadium. The game, known as The Big Chill at the Big House, took place on December 11, 2010. 104,173 fans filled Michigan Stadium and watched as Michigan beat Michigan State 5–0. The attendance broke the 75,000 of the Cold War and 78,000 of the 2010 IIHF World Championship and set a new attendance record for a hockey game. Later that same season on January 25, 2011, Rick Comley announced that he would retire at the conclusion of the 2010–11 season.

=== Tom Anastos and Big Ten Conference era ===
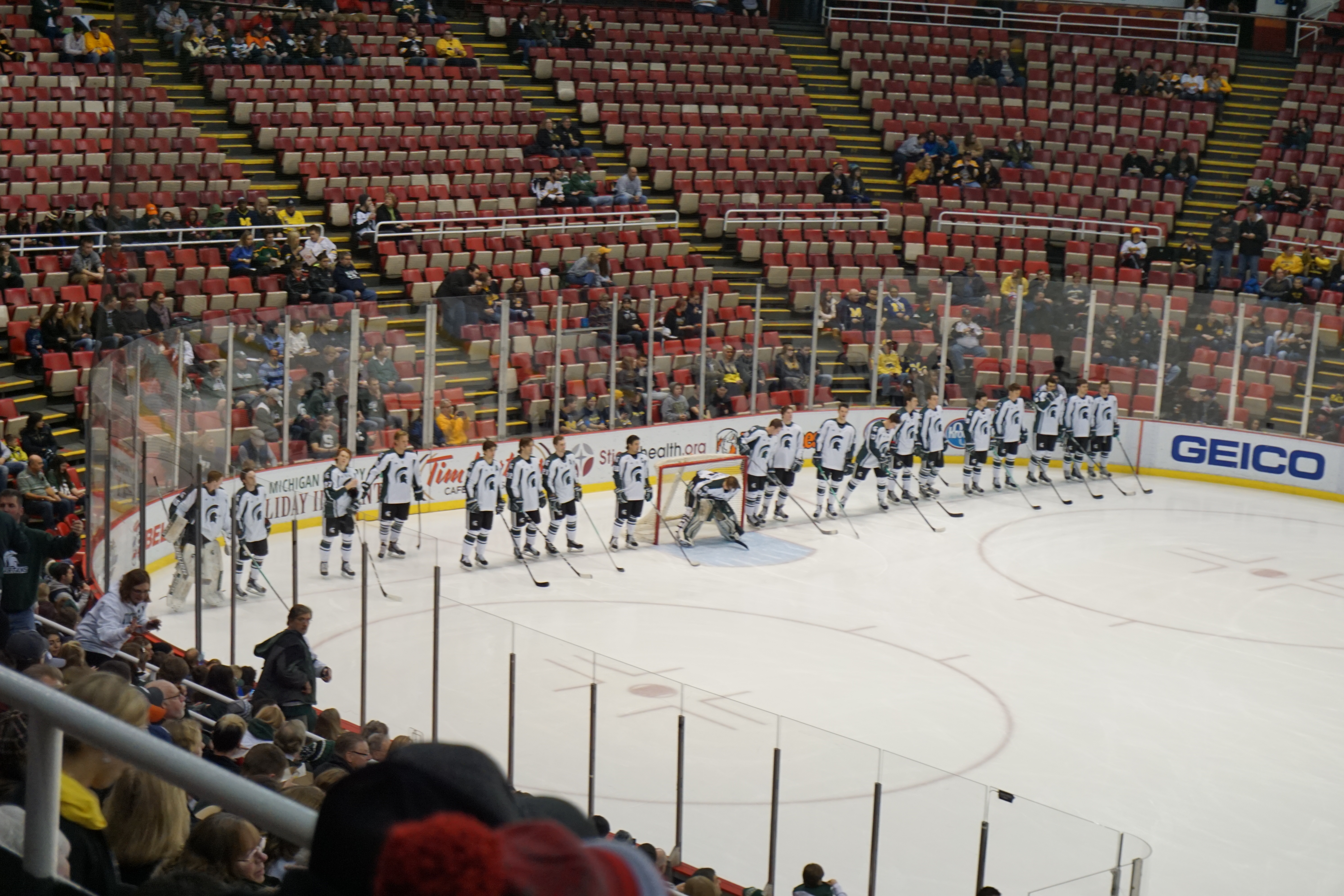
The Michigan State Spartans men's ice hockey team at the 2015 Great Lakes Invitational

In September 2010 Penn State University announced that the university was elevating its men's and women's American Collegiate Hockey Association club programs to varsity status. Then-CCHA commissioner Tom Anastos publicly stated that the CCHA would strongly consider adding Penn State as the conference's 12th member. On March 21, 2011, the Big Ten Conference announced plans to sponsor men's ice hockey starting in 2013–14 season. Michigan State along with CCHA rivals, University of Michigan and Ohio State University will leave the CCHA to join University of Minnesota and the University of Wisconsin from the WCHA and Penn State to form a six-team Big Ten Hockey Conference. Less than a week after the Big Ten's announcement Michigan State announced that former CCHA Commissioner, Tom Anastos would become the 6th head coach in the history of the program. Anastos is a former Spartan hockey player who played for MSU from 1981 to 1985. He is also the former coach at Michigan-Dearborn (NAIA) from 1987 to 1990, and compiled a 68-37-7 record. He later served as an assistant coach under Ron Mason from 1990 to 1992.

Anastos picked up his first NCAA DI coaching victory with Michigan State in the second game of the 2012 Icebreaker tournament with a 3–2 overtime win over Air Force. The Spartans finished the 2011–12 season ranked 5th in the CCHA standings and received a first round bye in the CCHA Tournament. The Spartans faced fourth-seeded Miami (OH) in the second round, in the best-of-three series Michigan State was swept 0-6 and 1–4 in two games. Despite being swept by Miami, the Spartans finished 15th in the Pairwise rankings and became the final at-large bid selected for the 2012 NCAA Tournament. The bid marked the team's first appearance in the NCAA post-season since 2008, the team was placed in the East Region held at Webster Bank Arena in Bridgeport, Connecticut. In the game, Union College took an early lead and held the Spartans to a single goal in a 3–1 win over Michigan State in the East Regional semifinal. The game was the first meeting between the two programs and also the first win in the NCAA Division I national tournament for the Dutchmen.

At the end of the 2016–17 season, it was announced that Tom Anastos would step down as head coach of the Spartans. MSU then announced that they had hired Danton Cole as the program's 7th head coach.

=== Danton Cole era ===
On April 11, 2017, Danton Cole was named head coach at Michigan State University. In Cole first season, 2017–18, the Spartans finished last in the Big Ten and were swept in a three-game series in the conference tournament by Ohio State. The next season, MSU once again finished last in the Big Ten and were swept by Notre Dame in the conference tournament. In 2019–20, the Spartans started the season strong and swept Michigan for the first time in Cole's tenure. However, the performances fell off and they finished sixth in the conference before being swept by Michigan in the Big Ten Tournament.

On April 12, 2022, he was fired by Michigan State. During five seasons as head coach, he led the Spartans to a 58–101–12 record.

=== Adam Nightingale era ===
On May 3, 2022, Adam Nightingale was named head coach at Michigan State University. During the 2022–23 season, in his first season with the Spartans, he led the team to an 18–18–2 record and the semifinals of the 2023 Big Ten tournament. On March 4, 2023, in the second game of the quarterfinals, Michigan State won their first Big Ten tournament game. This was their first win in 15 all-time games in the tournament for the Spartans. Michigan State won the series, and advanced to the semifinals for the first time in program history.

During the 2023–24 season, he led the Spartans to a 25–10–3 record, and the program's first Big Ten Conference regular season championship and Big Ten Tournament championship in program history. On March 7, 2024, he signed a five-year contract extension with Michigan State. The Spartans earned shares of the regular season conference championship in 2025 and 2026. In both seasons, they received a No. 1 seed in the NCAA tournament, but failed to advance to the Frozen Four.

== Season-by-season results ==
Source:

== Coaches ==
As of the end of the 2024–25 season

=== All-time coaching records ===
Tenure	Coach	Years	Record	Pct.
1921–1922	No Coach	1	0–4–0	.000
1924–1930	John Kobs	6	8–18–1	.315
1949–1951	Harold Paulsen	2	6–25–0	.194
1951–1979	Amo Bessone	28	367–427–20	.463
1979–2002	Ron Mason	23	635–270–69	.687
2002–2011	Rick Comley	9	186–140–39	.563
2011–2017	Tom Anastos	6	78–121–24	.404
2017–2022	Danton Cole	5	58–101–12	.374
2022–Present	Adam Nightingale	4	94–43–11	0.672
Totals	8 coaches	83 seasons	1,409–1,145–174	.548

== Awards and honors ==
=== Hockey Hall of Fame ===
- Duncan Keith (2025)

=== United States Hockey Hall of Fame ===
- Ron Mason (2013)

=== NCAA ===
==== Individual awards ====
Hobey Baker Award

- Kip Miller: 1990
- Ryan Miller: 2001
- Isaac Howard: 2025

Mike Richter Award

- Trey Augustine: 2026

NCAA Scoring Champion

- Steve Colp: 1974
- Tom Ross: 1975, 1976
- Bobby Reynolds: 1989
- Kip Miller: 1989, 1990
- Taro Hirose: 2019

Tournament Most Outstanding Player

- Gaye Cooley: 1966
- Mike Donnelly: 1986
- Justin Abdelkader: 2007

Spencer Penrose Award

- Amo Bessone: 1966
- Ron Mason: 1992

==== All-Americans ====
AHCA First Team All-Americans

- 1958-59: Joe Selinger, G
- 1961-62: John Chandik, G
- 1963-64: Carl Lackey, D
- 1964-65: Doug Roberts, F
- 1965-66: Doug Volmar, F
- 1968-69: Rick Duffett, G
- 1970-71: Don Thompson, F
- 1971-72: Jim Watt, G
- 1972-73: Bob Boyd, D
- 1973-74: Norm Barnes, D; Steve Colp, F
- 1974-75: Tom Ross, F
- 1975-76: Tom Ross, F
- 1981-82: Ron Scott, G
- 1982-83: Ron Scott, G
- 1984-85: Dan McFall, D; Kelly Miller, F; Craig Simpson, F
- 1985-86: Mike Donnelly, F
- 1986-87: Mitch Messier, F
- 1988-89: Kip Miller, F; Bobby Reynolds, F
- 1989-90: Kip Miller, F
- 1990-91: Jason Woolley, D
- 1991-92: Joby Messier, D; Dwayne Norris, F
- 1992-93: Bryan Smolinski, F
- 1997-98: Chad Alban, G; Mike York, F
- 1998-99: Joe Blackburn, G; Mike York, F
- 1999-00: Shawn Horcoff, F
- 2000-01: Ryan Miller, G
- 2001-02: Ryan Miller, G
- 2002-03: John-Michael Liles, D
- 2011-12: Torey Krug, D
- 2014-15: Jake Hildebrand, G
- 2018-19: Taro Hirose, F
- 2024-25: Trey Augustine, G; Isaac Howard, F

AHCA Second Team All-Americans

- 1983-84: Dan McFall, D
- 1984-85: Gary Haight, D
- 1985-86: Donald McSween, D
- 1986-87: Donald McSween, D
- 1989-90: Jason Muzzatti, G
- 1991-92: Doug Zmolek, D
- 1993-94: Steve Guolla, F
- 1994-95: Anson Carter, F
- 1997-98: Tyler Harlton, D; Sean Berens, F
- 1998-99: Mike Weaver, F
- 1999-00: Mike Weaver, F
- 2001-02: Andrew Hutchinson, D; John-Michael Liles, D
- 2002-03: Brad Fast, D
- 2003-04: A. J. Thelen, D; Jim Slater, F
- 2007-08: Jeff Lerg, G
- 2009-10: Jeff Petry, D
- 2023–24: Artyom Levshunov, D
- 2024–25: Matt Basgall, D

=== WCHA ===
==== Individual awards ====
Most Valuable Player

- Tom Ross, C: 1975

Sophomore of the Year

- Don Thompson, F: 1970

Freshman of the Year

- Ron Scott, G: 1981

==== All-Conference Teams ====
First Team All-WCHA

- 1965–66: Doug Volmar, F
- 1966–67: Tom Mikkola, F
- 1970–71: Don Thompson, F
- 1971–72: Jim Watt, G
- 1972–73: Bob Boyd, D
- 1973–74: Norm Barnes, D; Steve Colp, F
- 1974–75: Tom Ross, F
- 1975–76: Tom Ross, F
- 1980–81: Ron Scott, G

Second Team All-WCHA

- 1957–58: Joe Selinger, G
- 1963–64: Carl Lackey, G
- 1964–65: Doug Roberts, G
- 1971–72: Bob Boyd, D; Don Thompson, F
- 1973–74: Tom Ross, F
- 1975–76: Steve Colp, F

=== CCHA ===
==== Individual awards ====
Player of the Year

- Kip Miller, LW: 1990
- Dwayne Norris, D: 1992
- Chad Alban, G: 1998
- Mike York, C: 1999
- Shawn Horcoff, C: 2000
- Ryan Miller, G: 2001
- Ryan Miller, G: 2002
- Torey Krug, D: 2012

Best Defensive Forward

- Mike York, C: 1999
- Shawn Horcoff, C: 2000
- John Nail, RW: 2001
- Drew Miller, LW: 2006
- Justin Abdelkader, C: 2008

Best Defensive Defenseman

- Joby Messier: 1992
- Tyler Harlton: 1997, 1998
- Mike Weaver: 1999, 2000
- Andrew Hutchinson: 2001
- Brad Fast: 2003

Best Offensive Defenseman

- Jason Woolley: 1991
- John-Michael Liles: 2002, 2003
- A. J. Thelen: 2004
- Torey Krug: 2011, 2012

Best Goaltender

- Ryan Miller: 2001, 2002
- Dominic Vicari: 2004
- Scott Borek: 2000

Coach of the Year

- Ron Mason: 1985, 1989, 1990, 1999

Perani Cup

- Jeff Lerg, G: 2007
- Drew Palmisano, G: 2010

Scholar-Athlete of the Year

- Jeff Lerg, G: 2008

Terry Flanagan Memorial Award

- Wes McCauley, D: 1993
- Jon Gaskins, D: 1996
- Bryan Adams, LW: 1998
- Brian Maloney, LW: 2003

Best Defensive Forward

- Bill Shibicky, F: 1984
- Joe Murphy, RW: 1986
- Rod Brind'Amour, C: 1989
- Jeff Lerg, G: 2006

Ilitch Humanitarian Award

- Drew Miller, LW: 2006
- Justin Abdelkader, C: 2008
- Jeff Lerg, G: 2009
- Trevor Nill, C: 2011

Tournament Most Valuable Player

- Ron Scott, G: 1982
- Norm Foster, G: 1985
- Bobby Reynolds, RW: 1987
- Jason Muzzatti, G: 1989
- Peter White, C: 1990
- Mike York, C: 1998
- Ryan Miller, G: 2000, 2001
- Jeff Lerg, G: 2006

==== All-Conference Teams ====
First Team All-CCHA

- 1981–82: Ron Scott, G; Newell Brown, F
- 1982–83: Ron Scott, G; Ken Leiter, D
- 1983–84: Dan McFall, D
- 1984–85: Bob Essensa, G; Gary Haight, D; Donald McSween, D; Craig Simpson, F; Kelly Miller, F
- 1985–86: Donald McSween, D; Mike Donnelly, F
- 1986–87: Donald McSween, D; Mitch Messier, F
- 1987–88: Tim Tilley, D
- 1988–89: Kip Miller, F
- 1989–90: Jason Muzzatti, G; Kip Miller, F
- 1990–91: Jason Woolley, D
- 1991–92: Joby Messier, D; Dwayne Norris, F
- 1992–93: Bryan Smolinski, F
- 1993–94: Anson Carter, F
- 1994–95: Anson Carter, F
- 1997–98: Chad Alban, G; Tyler Harlton, D; Sean Berens, F
- 1998–99: Mike Weaver, D; Mike York, F
- 1999–00: Mike Weaver, D; Shawn Horcoff, F
- 2000–01: Ryan Miller, G
- 2001–02: Ryan Miller, G; John-Michael Liles, D
- 2002–03: Brad Fast, D; John-Michael Liles, D; Jim Slater, F
- 2003–04: A. J. Thelen, D; Jim Slater, F
- 2007–08: Jeff Lerg, G
- 2010–11: Torey Krug, D
- 2011–12: Torey Krug, D

Second Team All-CCHA

- 1981–82: Gary Haight, D; Mark Hamway, F
- 1982–83: Gary Haight, D
- 1983–84: Norm Foster, G
- 1984–85: Dan McFall, D; Tom Anastos, F
- 1985–86: Bob Essensa, G
- 1986–87: Bill Shibicky, F
- 1987–88: Jason Muzzatti, G; Bobby Reynolds, F
- 1988–89: Chris Luongo, D; Bobby Reynolds, F
- 1989–90: Don Gibson, D; Pat Murray, F
- 1990–91: Mike Gilmore, G
- 1993–94: Mike Buzak, G; Steve Guolla, F
- 1994–95: Mike Buzak, G; Rem Murray, F
- 1995–96: Anson Carter, F
- 1996–97: Sean Berens, F
- 1997–98: Mike York, F
- 1998–99: Joe Blackburn, G
- 1999–00: Ryan Miller, G; Adam Hall, F
- 2000–01: Andrew Hutchinson, D; John-Michael Liles, D
- 2001–02: Andrew Hutchinson, D
- 2007–08: Tim Kennedy, F
- 2008–09: Jeff Lerg, G
- 2009–10: Drew Palmisano, G; Jeff Petry, D; Corey Tropp, F

CCHA All-Rookie Team

- 1988–89: Jason Woolley, D; Rod Brind'Amour, F; Peter White, F
- 1991–92: Rem Murray, F; Steve Suk, F
- 1995–96: Chris Bogas, D; Mike York, F
- 1997–98: Rustyn Dolyny, F
- 1998–99: Adam Hall, F
- 1999–00: Ryan Miller, G
- 2001–02: Jim Slater, F
- 2002–03: David Booth, F
- 2003–04: Dominic Vicari, G; A. J. Thelen, D
- 2005–06: Jeff Lerg, G
- 2007–08: Jeff Petry, D
- 2009–10: Torey Krug, D

=== Big Ten ===
==== Individual awards ====
Coach of the Year

- Adam Nightingale, 2024, 2026

Player of the Year

- Jake Hildebrand, G: 2015
- Taro Hirose, F: 2019
- Isaac Howard, F: 2025

Defensive Player of the Year

- Artyom Levshunov, D: 2024
- Matt Basgall, D: 2026

Goaltender of the Year

- Jake Hildebrand, G: 2015
- Trey Augustine, G: 2025, 2026

Freshman of the Year

- Mitchell Lewandowski, F: 2018
- Artyom Levshunov, D: 2024

Scoring Champion

- Taro Hirose, F: 2019
- Isaac Howard, F: 2025

Tournament Most Outstanding Player

- Trey Augustine, G: 2024
- Isaac Howard, F: 2025

==== All-Conference Teams ====
First Team All-Big Ten

- 2014–15: Jake Hildebrand, G
- 2018–19: Taro Hirose, F
- 2023–24: Artyom Levshunov, D
- 2024–25: Trey Augustine, G; Matt Basgall, D; Isaac Howard, F
- 2025–26: Trey Augustine, G; Matt Basgall, D; Porter Martone, F; Charlie Stramel, F

Second Team All-Big Ten

- 2014–15: Travis Walsh, D
- 2017–18: Taro Hirose, F
- 2018–19: Patrick Khodorenko, F
- 2023–24: Trey Augustine, G

Big Ten Freshman Team

- 2014–15: Josh Jacobs, D
- 2015–16: Zach Osburn, D
- 2017–18: Mitchell Lewandowski, F
- 2018–19: Dennis Cesana, D; Drew DeRidder, G
- 2023–24: Artyom Levshunov, D; Trey Augustine, G
- 2025–26: Porter Martone, F

== Statistical leaders ==
=== Points ===
Player	Years	GP	G	A	Pts	PIM
Tom Ross	1972–1976	155	138	186	324	94
Steve Colp	1972–1976	138	132	168	300	158
Kip Miller	1986–1990	176	116	145	261	299
Peter White	1988–1992	172	75	155	230	83
Daryl Rice	1972–1976	138	96	129	225	204

=== Saves ===
GP = Games played; Min = Minutes played; W = Wins; L = Losses; T = Ties; GA = Goals against; SO = Shutouts; SV% = Save percentage; GAA = Goals against average

Minimum 30 games

Player	Years	GP	Min	W	L	T	GA	SO	SV%	GAA
Ryan Miller	1999–2002	116	6383	73	18	12	164	26	.941	1.54
Joe Blackburn	1997–2001	57	3403	36	13	8	100	5	.920	1.76
Dominic Vicari	2003–2006	83	4845	41	24	7	191	16	.916	2.37
Jeff Lerg	2005–2009	146	8690	76	51	17	344	12	.921	2.38
Trey Augustine	2023–2026	99	5985	66	25	7	239	6	.922	2.40
Chad Alban	1994–1998	128	7633	88	30	10	284	12	.906	2.46

Statistics current through the start of the 2020–21 season.

=== Assists ===
Career
Rk	Player	Assists	Seasons
1	Tom Ross	186	1972–73 1973–74 1974–75 1975–76
2	Steve Colp	168	1972–73 1973–74 1974–75 1975–76
3	Peter White	155	1988–89 1989–90 1990–91 1991–92
4	Rem Murray	147	1991–92 1992–93 1993–94 1994–95
5	Kip Miller	145	1986–87 1987–88 1988–89 1989–90

Season
Rk	Player	Assists	Season
1	Pat Murray	60	1989–90
2	Tom Ross	59	1974–75
3	Kevin Miller	56	1986–87
	Norm Barnes	56	1973–74
5	Steve Colp	54	1975–76
	Tom Ross	54	1975–76
	Steve Colp	54	1973–74

Single Game
Rk	Player	Assists	Season	Opponent
1	Steve Colp	6	1974–75	Michigan
	Daryl Rice	6	1973–74	Boston College
	Real Turcotte	6	1960–61	Ohio

=== Goals ===
Career
Rk	Player	Goals	Seasons
1	Tom Ross	138	1972–73 1973–74 1974–75 1975–76
2	Steve Colp	132	1972–73 1973–74 1974–75 1975–76
3	Kip Miller	116	1986–87 1987–88 1988–89 1989–90
4	Mike Donnelly	110	1982–83 1983–84 1984–85 1985–86
5	Bobby Reynolds	107	1985–86 1986–87 1987–88 1988–89

Season
Rk	Player	Goals	Season
1	Mike Donnelly	59	1985–86
2	Tom Ross	51	1975–76
3	Kip Miller	48	1989–90
4	Dwayne Norris	44	1991–92
	Mitch Messier	44	1986–87

Single Game
Rk	Player	Goals	Season	Opponent
1	Mike Donnelly	5	1985–86	Ohio State
	Tom Ross	5	1973–74	Notre Dame
	Don Thompson	5	1969–70	Michigan
	Bob Doyle	5	1960–61	Ohio

== Olympians ==
This is a list of Michigan State alumni were a part of an Olympic team.

Name	Position	Michigan State Tenure	Team	Year	Finish
Weldon Olson	Wing	1951–1955	(United States) USA	1956, 1960	Silver, Gold
Eugene Grazia	Left wing	1954–1958	(United States) USA	1960	Gold
Doug Volmar	Right wing	1964–1967	(United States) USA	1968	6th
Brian Glennie	Defenseman	1966–1967	Canada	1968	Bronze
Gary Haight	Defenseman	1980–1983, 1984–1985	(United States) USA	1984	7th
Kevin Miller	Center	1984–1988	(United States) USA	1988	7th
Geir Hoff	Left wing	1985–1987	Norway	1988, 1992, 1994	12th, 9th, 11th
Jason Woolley	Defenseman	1988–1991	Canada	1992	Silver
Dwayne Norris	Right wing	1988–1992	Canada	1994	Silver
Rod Brind'Amour	Center	1988–1989	Canada	1998	4th
Mike York	Left wing	1995–1999	(United States) USA	2002	Silver
John-Michael Liles	Defenseman	1999–2003	(United States) USA	2006	8th
Tony Tuzzolino	Center	1993–1997	Italy	2006	11th
Jason Muzzatti	Goaltender	1987–1991	Italy	2006	11th
Ryan Miller	Goaltender	1999–2002	(United States) USA	2010, 2014	Silver, 4th
Duncan Keith	Defenseman	2001–2003	Canada	2010, 2014	Gold, Gold
Jim Slater	Center	2001–2005	(United States) USA	2018	7th
Brock Radunske	Left wing	2001–2004	South Korea	2018	12th
Justin Abdelkader	Left wing	2006–2008	United States	2022	5th
Wojciech Stachowiak	Left wing	2018–2020	(Germany) GER	2026	6th
Dustin Gazley	Forward	2007–2011	(Italy) ITA	2026	12th

== Players ==
=== Current roster ===
As of August 28, 2025.

No.	Nat.	Player	Class	Pos	Height	Weight	DoB	Hometown	Previous team	NHL rights
1	(United States)	Trey Augustine	Junior	G	6' 1" (1.85 m)	179 lb (81 kg)	2005-02-23	South Lyon, Michigan	USNTDP (USHL)	DET, 41st overall 2023
2	(United States)	Patrick Geary	Junior	D	6' 1" (1.85 m)	185 lb (84 kg)	2004-02-18	Hamburg, New York	Waterloo Black Hawks (USHL)	BUF, 172nd overall 2024
3	(United States)	Sean Barnhill	Freshman	D	6' 6" (1.98 m)	214 lb (97 kg)	2007-01-08	Scottsdale, Arizona	Dubuque Fighting Saints (USHL)	NYR, 70th overall 2025
4	(United States)	Colin Ralph	Sophomore	D	6' 5" (1.96 m)	227 lb (103 kg)	2005-10-04	Maple Grove, Minnesota	St. Cloud State (NCHC)	STL, 48th overall 2024
5	(United States)	Travis Shoudy	Senior	D	5' 9" (1.75 m)	173 lb (78 kg)	2002-03-15	Marysville, Michigan	Ferris State (CCHA)	—
6	(United States)	Cole Ward	Freshman	D	6' 6" (1.98 m)	209 lb (95 kg)	2005-11-12	Rochester Hills, Michigan	Tri-City Storm (USHL)	—
8	(Slovakia)	Maxim Štrbák	Junior	D	6' 2" (1.88 m)	205 lb (93 kg)	2005-04-13	Košice, Slovakia	Sioux Falls Stampede (USHL)	BUF, 45th overall 2023
9	(United States)	Matt Basgall	Senior	D	5' 9" (1.75 m)	190 lb (86 kg)	2002-08-16	Lake Forest, Illinois	Tri-City Storm (USHL)	—
10	(Finland)	Tommi Männistö	Junior	F	6' 0" (1.83 m)	185 lb (84 kg)	2004-02-07	Riihimäki, Finland	Tappara U20 (U20 SM-sarja)	—
11	(United States)	Owen West	Sophomore	D	5' 11" (1.8 m)	179 lb (81 kg)	2004-06-01	Pittsboro, Indiana	Des Moines Buccaneers (USHL)	—
12	(United States)	Griffin Jurecki	Junior	F	5' 10" (1.78 m)	182 lb (83 kg)	2003-05-03	Grosse Ile, Michigan	Omaha Lancers (USHL)	—
13	(United States)	Tiernan Shoudy	Senior	F	5' 9" (1.75 m)	180 lb (82 kg)	2002-03-15	St. Clair, Michigan	Youngstown Phantoms (USHL)	—
14	(Canada)	Matt Lahey	Freshman	D	6' 6" (1.98 m)	203 lb (92 kg)	2006-07-17	Victoria, British Columbia	Fargo Force (USHL)	TOR, 200th overall 2024
15	(United States)	Charlie Stramel	Senior	F	6' 3" (1.91 m)	215 lb (98 kg)	2004-10-15	Rosemount, Minnesota	Wisconsin (Big Ten)	MIN, 21st overall 2023
18	(United States)	Ryker Lee	Freshman	F	6' 1" (1.85 m)	185 lb (84 kg)	2006-11-08	Wilmette, Illinois	Madison Capitols (USHL)	NSH, 26th overall 2025
19	(United States)	Austin Baker	Freshman	F	6' 0" (1.83 m)	190 lb (86 kg)	2006-02-11	White Lake Township, Michigan	Sioux Falls Stampede (USHL)	DET, 203rd overall 2024
20	(United States)	Daniel Russell	Senior	F	5' 9" (1.75 m)	160 lb (73 kg)	2001-11-16	Traverse City, Michigan	Sioux Falls Stampede (USHL)	—
21	(Canada)	Anthony Romani	Freshman	F	6' 1" (1.85 m)	194 lb (88 kg)	2005-07-12	Pickering, Ontario	Barrie Colts (OHL)	VAN, 162nd overall 2024
22	(Canada)	Porter Martone	Freshman	F	6' 3" (1.91 m)	209 lb (95 kg)	2006-10-26	Peterborough, Ontario	Brampton Steelheads (OHL)	PHI, 6th overall 2025
23	(United States)	Shane Vansaghi	Sophomore	F	6' 2" (1.88 m)	207 lb (94 kg)	2006-10-11	St. Louis, Missouri	USNTDP (USHL)	PHI, 48th overall 2025
24	(Canada)	Nathan Mackie	Sophomore	F	5' 11" (1.8 m)	163 lb (74 kg)	2004-06-03	Prince George, British Columbia	Salmon Arm Silverbacks (BCHL)	—
25	(United States)	Cole Burke	Freshman	F	6' 2" (1.88 m)	181 lb (82 kg)	2004-02-18	Trenton, Michigan	Fairbanks Ice Dogs (NAHL)	—
26	(Sweden)	Eric Nilson	Freshman	F	6' 0" (1.83 m)	165 lb (75 kg)	2007-05-11	Calgary, Alberta	Djurgårdens IF U20 (J20 Nationell)	ANA, 45th overall 2025
28	(Canada)	Cayden Lindstrom	Freshman	F	6' 3" (1.91 m)	220 lb (100 kg)	2006-02-03	Chetwynd, British Columbia	Medicine Hat Tigers (WHL)	CBJ, 4th overall 2024
29	(United States)	Gavin O'Connell	Junior	F	6' 0" (1.83 m)	181 lb (82 kg)	2004-02-19	Wayzata, Minnesota	Waterloo Black Hawks (USHL)	—
30	(United States)	Dolan Gilbert	Senior	G	6' 2" (1.88 m)	174 lb (79 kg)	2001-04-25	South Bend, Indiana	Concordia (NCHA)	—
32	(Sweden)	Melvin Strahl	Freshman	G	6' 3" (1.91 m)	170 lb (77 kg)	2005-03-18	Sollefteå, Sweden	Youngstown Phantoms (USHL)	CBJ, 156th overall 2023

== Spartans in the NHL ==
As of July 1, 2025.

= NHL All-Star team	= NHL All-Star	= NHL All-Star and NHL All-Star team	= Hall of Famers

Player	Position	Team(s)	Years	Games	Stanley Cups
Justin Abdelkader	Left wing	DET	2007–2020	739	0
Bryan Adams	Left wing	ATL	1999–2001	11	0
Mason Appleton	Center	WPG, SEA, DET	2018–Present	400	0
Norm Barnes	Defenseman	PHI, HFD	1976–1982	156	0
David Booth	Left wing	FLA, VAN, TOR, DET	2006–2018	530	0
Rod Brind'Amour	Center	STL, PHI, CAR	1989–2010	1,484	1
Jeff Brubaker	Left wing	HFD, MTL, CGY, TOR, EDM, NYR, DET	1979–1989	178	0
Anson Carter	Center	WSH, BOS, EDM, NYR, LAK, VAN, CBJ, CAR	1996–2007	674	0
Jake Chelios	Defenseman	DET	2018–2019	5	0
Danton Cole	Right wing	WPG, TBL, NJD, NYI, CHI	1989–1996	318	0
Jim Cummins	Right wing	DET, PHI, TBL, CHI, PHO, MTL, ANA, NYI, COL	1991–2004	511	0
Jim Cunningham	Left wing	PHI	1977–1978	1	0
Nelson Debenedet	Defenseman	DET, PIT	1973–1975	46	0
Mike Donnelly	Left wing	NYR, BUF, LAK, DAL, NYI	1986–1997	465	0
Karsen Dorwart	Left wing	PHI	2024–Present	5	0
Bob Essensa	Goaltender	WPG, DET, EDM, PHO, VAN, BUF	1988–2002	446	0
Brad Fast	Defenseman	CAR	2003–2004	1	0
Norm Foster	Goaltender	BUF, EDM	1990–1992	13	0
Don Gibson	Defenseman	VAN	1990–1991	14	0
Brian Glennie	Defenseman	TOR, LAK	1969–1979	572	0
Derek Grant	Center	OTT, CGY, BUF, NSH, ANA, PIT PHI	2012–2023	427	0
Steve Guolla	Center	SJS, TBL, ATL, NJD	1996–2003	205	0
Adam Hall	Right wing	NSH, NYR, MIN, PIT, TBL, CAR, PHI	2001–2014	682	0
Mark Hamway	Forward	NYI	1984–1987	53	0
Jeff Harding	Right wing	PHI	1988–1990	15	0
Shawn Heaphy	Center	CGY	1992–1993	1	0
Taro Hirose	Forward	DET	2019–2023	60	0
Shawn Horcoff	Center	EDM, DAL, ANA	2000–2016	1,008	0
Andrew Hutchinson	Defenseman	NSH, CAR, TBL, DAL, PIT	2003–2011	140	1
Joshua Jacobs	Goaltender	NJD	2018–2020	3	0
Bob Johnson	Goaltender	STL, PIT	1972–1975	24	0
Duncan Keith	Defenseman	CHI , EDM	2005–2022	1,256	3
Tim Kennedy	Left wing	BUF, FLA, SJS, PHO	2008–2014	162	0
Dale Krentz	Forward	DET	1986–1989	30	0
Torey Krug	Defenseman	BOS, STL	2011–Present	778	0
Ken Leiter	Defenseman	NYI, MNS	1984–1990	143	0
Bryan Lerg	Forward	SJS	2014–2016	8	0
Artyom Levshunov	Defenseman	CHI	2024–Present	18	0
John-Michael Liles	Defenseman	COL, TOR, CAR, BOS	2003–2017	836	0
Chris Luongo	Defenseman	DET, OTT, NYI	1990–1996	218	0

Player	Position	Team(s)	Years	Games	Stanley Cups
Mackenzie MacEachern	Left wing	STL, CAR	2018–2024	123	0
Dan McFall	Defenseman	WPG	1984–1986	9	0
Brian McReynolds	Center	WPG, NYR, LAK	1989–1994	30	0
Donald McSween	Defenseman	BUF, ANA	1987–1996	47	0
Joby Messier	Defenseman	NYR	1992–1995	25	0
Mitch Messier	Right wing	MNS	1987–1991	20	0
Drew Miller	Left wing	ANA, TBL, DET	2006–2017	571	1
Kelly Miller	Left wing	NYR, WAS	1984–1999	1,048	0
Kevin Miller	Right wing	NYR, DET, WAS, STL, SJS, PIT, CHI, NYI, OTT	1988–2004	620	0
Kip Miller	Center	QUE, MNS, SJS, NYI, PIT, ANA, WAS	1990–2004	449	0
Ryan Miller	Goaltender	BUF, STL, VAN, ANA	2002–2021	796	0
Chris Mueller	Center	NSH, DAL, NYR	2010–2015	53	0
Joe Murphy	Right wing	DET, EDM, CHI, STL, SJS, BOS, WSH	1986–2001	779	1
Pat Murray	Left wing	PHI	1990–1992	25	0
Rem Murray	Left wing	EDM, NYR, NSH	1996–2006	560	0
Jason Muzzatti	Goaltender	CGY, HFD, NYR, SJS	1993–1998	62	0
Dwayne Norris	Right wing	QUE, ANA	1993–1996	20	0
Jeff Parker	Right wing	BUF, HFD	1986–1991	141	0
Jeff Petry	Defenseman	EDM, MTL, PIT, DET, FLA	2010–Present	981	0
Lyle Phair	Left wing	LAK	1985–1988	48	0
Corey Potter	Defenseman	NYR, PIT, EDM, BOS, CGY, NSH	2008–2016	130	0
Bobby Reynolds	Left wing	TOR	1989–1990	7	0
Doug Roberts	Right wing	DET, OAK, BOS	1965–1975	419	0
Ron Scott	Left wing	NYR, LAK	1983–1990	28	0
Craig Simpson	Left wing	PIT, EDM, BUF	1985–1995	634	2
Jim Slater	Center	ATL, WIN	2005–2015	584	0
Bryan Smolinski	Center	BOS, PIT, NYI, LAK, OTT, CHI, VAN, MTL	1990–2004	1,056	0
Dean Sylvester	Right wing	BUF, ATL	1999–2001	96	0
Tom Tilley	Defenseman	STL	1988–1994	174	0
Corey Tropp	Right wing	BUF, CBJ, ANA	2011–2017	149	0
Tony Tuzzolino	Center	ANA, NYR, BOS	1997–2002	9	0
Doug Volmar	Right wing	DET, LAK	1969–1973	62	0
Jim Watt	Goaltender	STL	1973–1974	1	0
Mike Watt	Left wing	EDM, NYI, NSH, CAR	1997–2003	157	0
Mike Weaver	Defenseman	ATL, LAK, VAN, STL, FLA, MTL	2001–2015	633	0
Peter White	Center	EDM, TOR, PHI, CHI	1993–2004	220	0
Neil Wilkinson	Defenseman	MNS, SJS, CHI, WPG, PIT	1989–1999	460	0
Jason Woolley	Defenseman	WSH, FLA, PIT, BUF, DET	1991–2006	718	0
Mike York	Center	NYR, EDM, NYI, PHI, PHO, CBJ	1999–2009	579	0

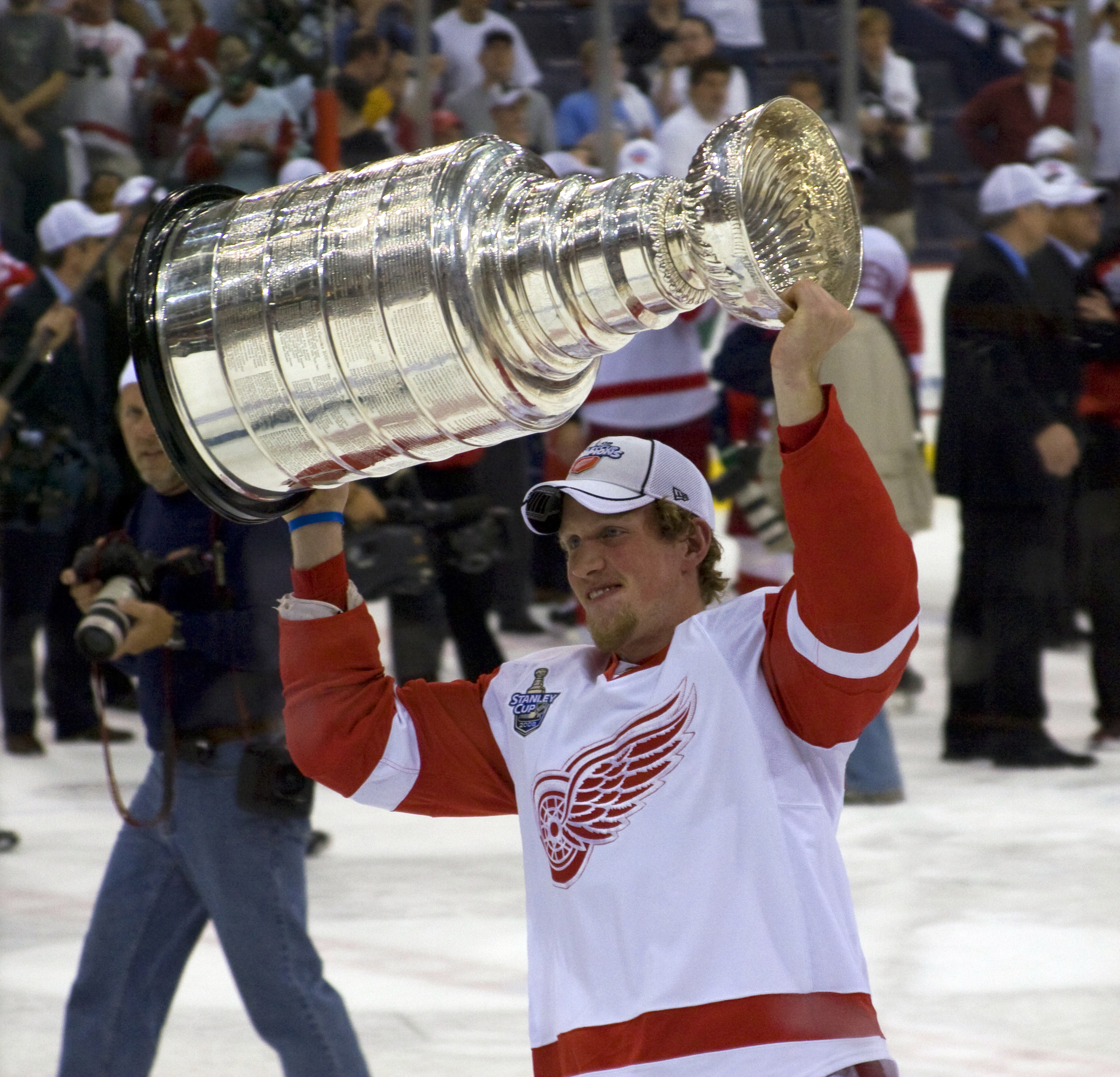
Justin Abdelkader

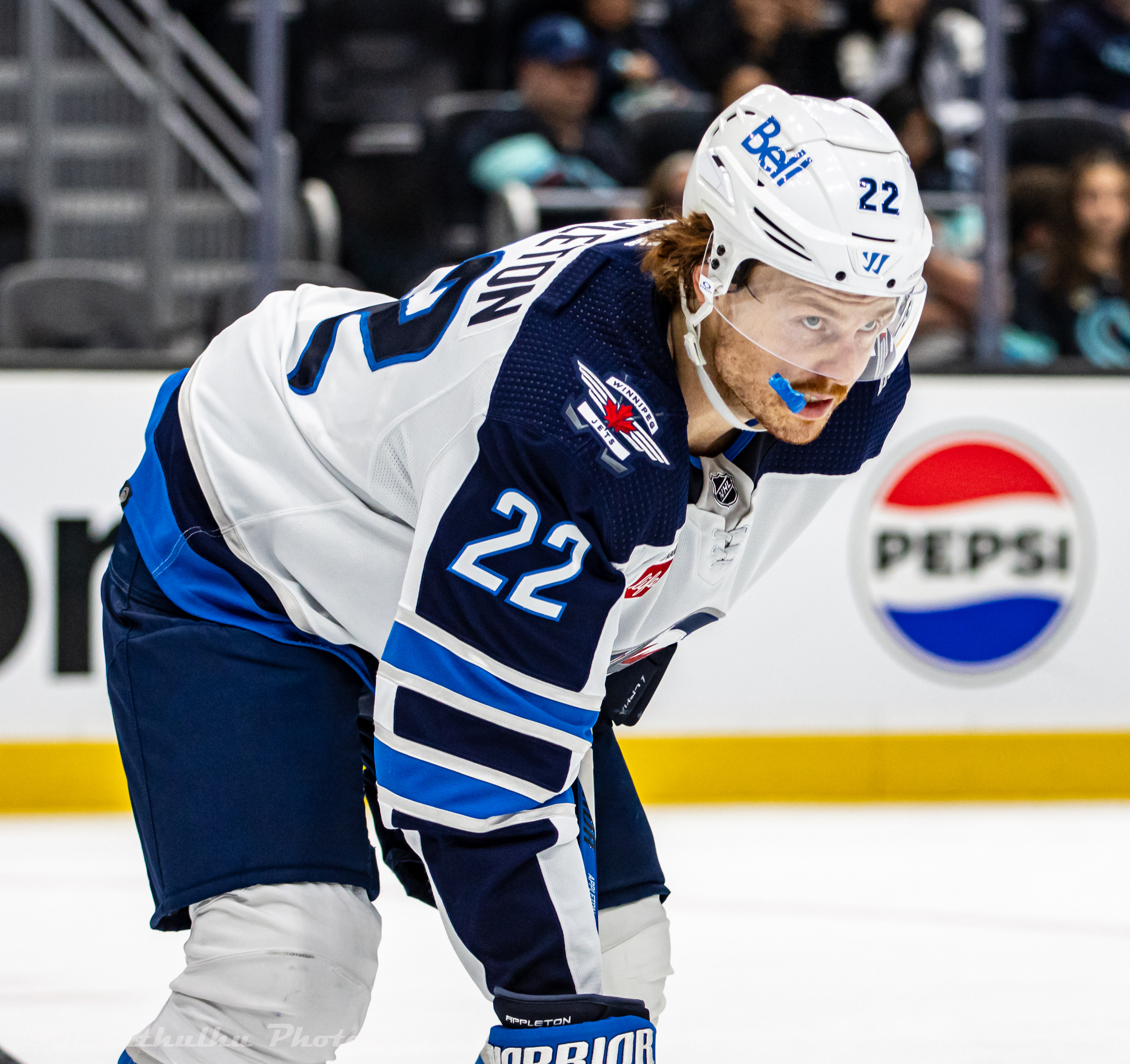
Mason Appleton

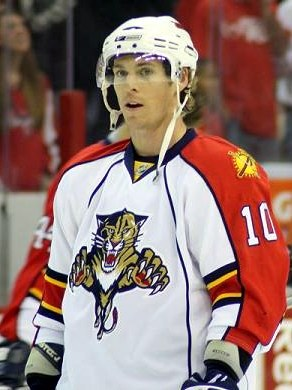
David Booth

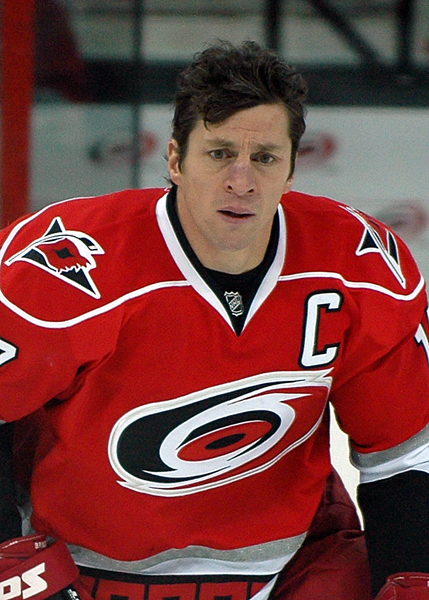
Rod Brind'Amour

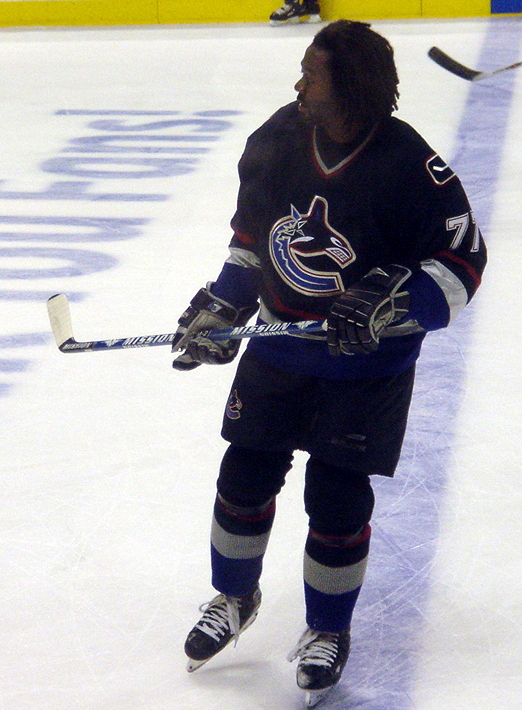
Anson Carter

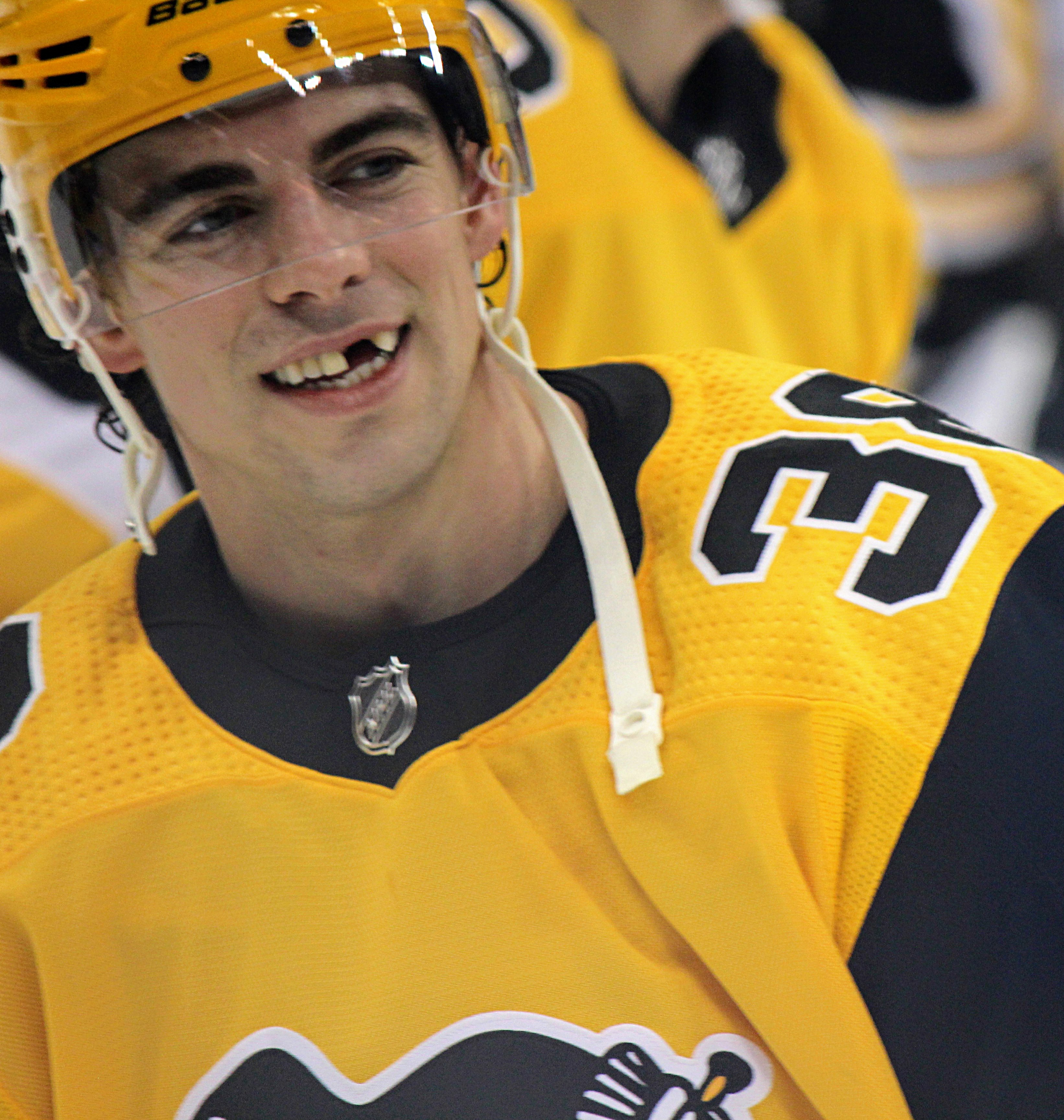
Derek Grant

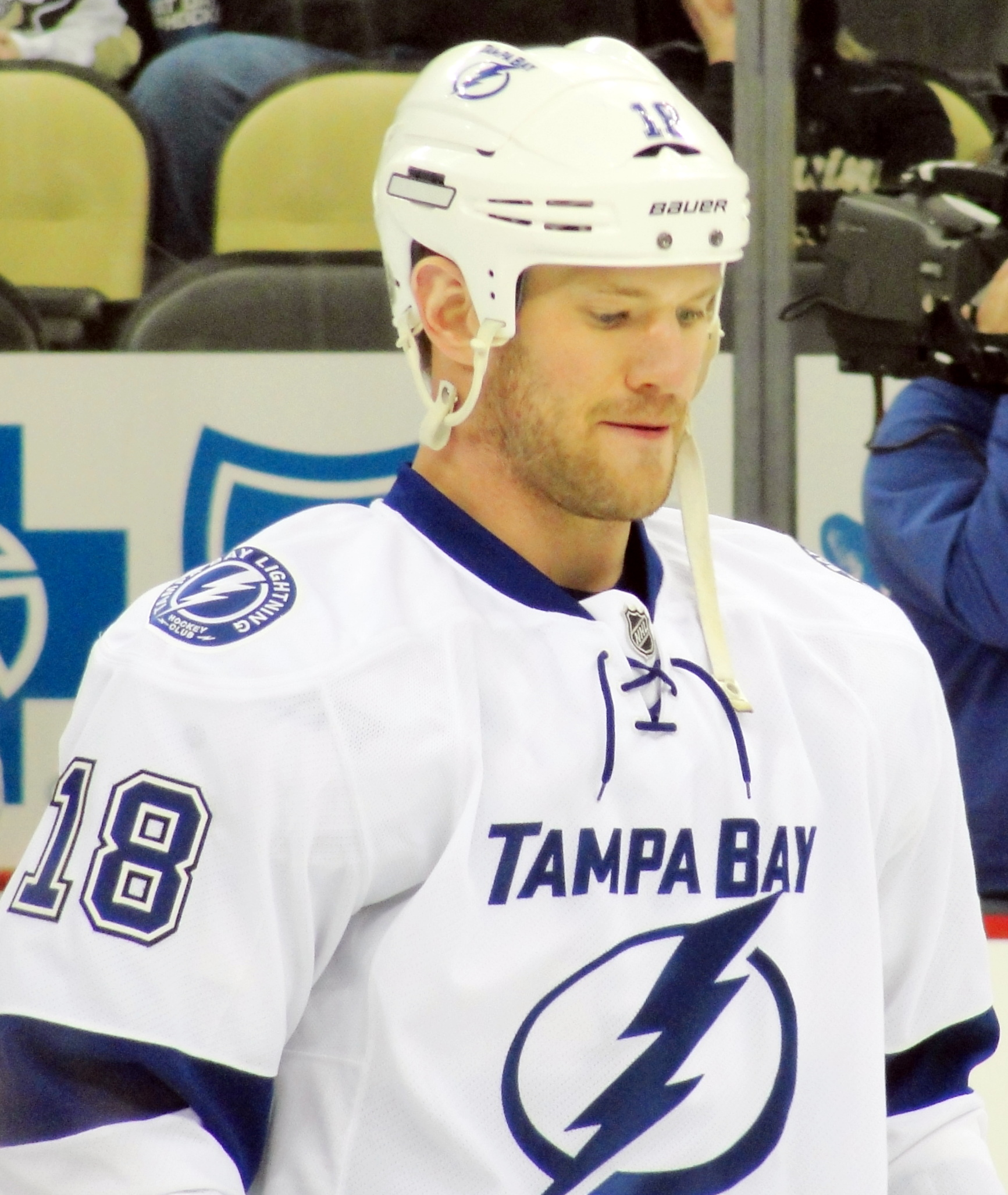
Adam Hall

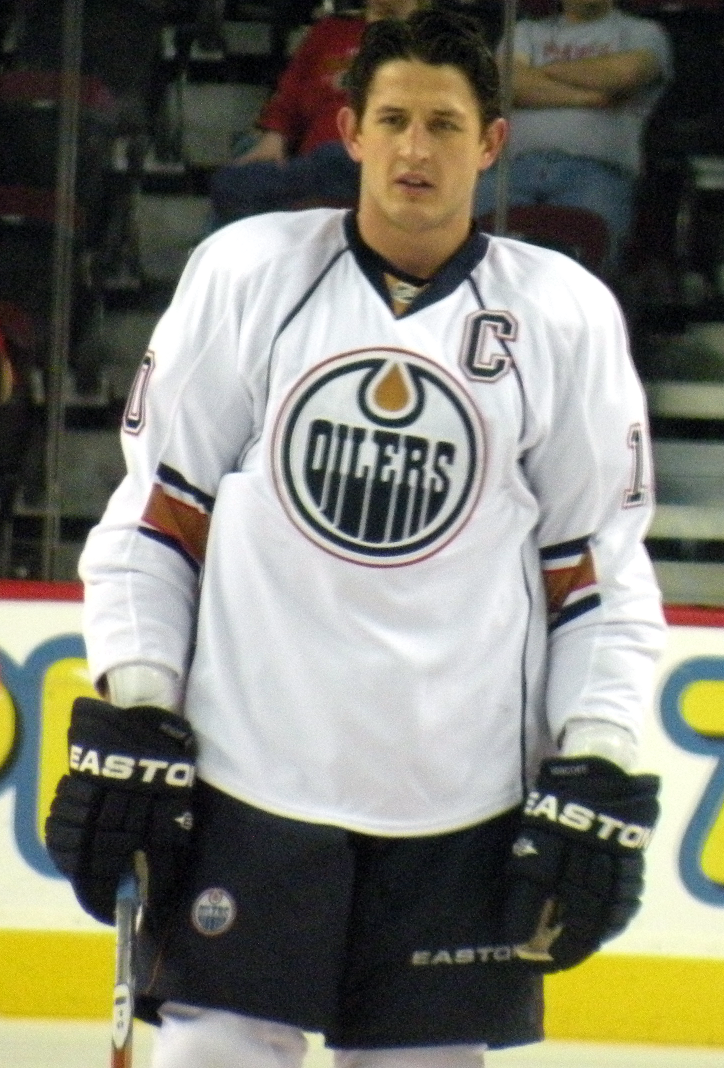
Shawn Horcoff

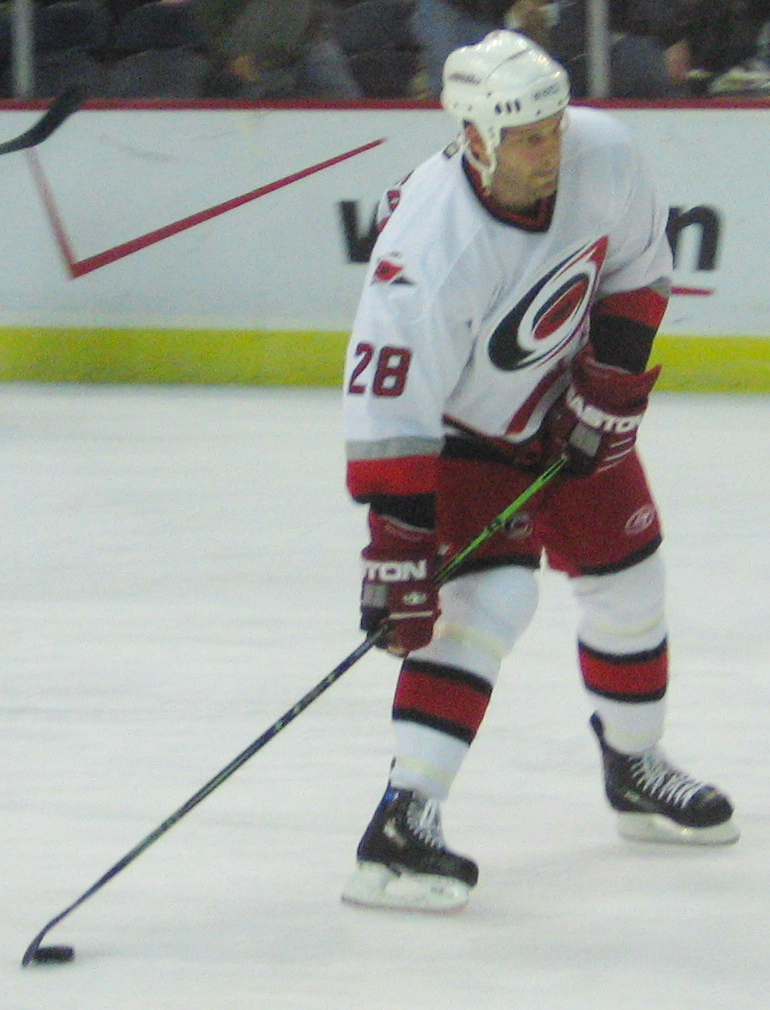
Andrew Hutchinson

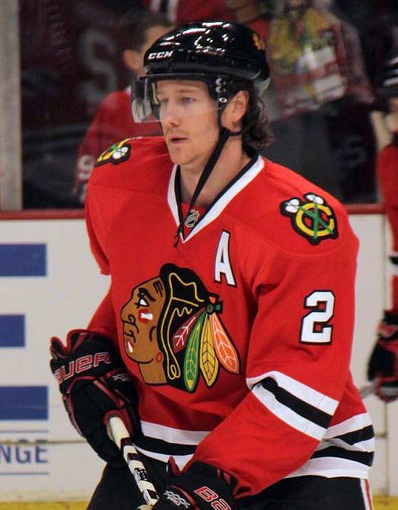
Duncan Keith

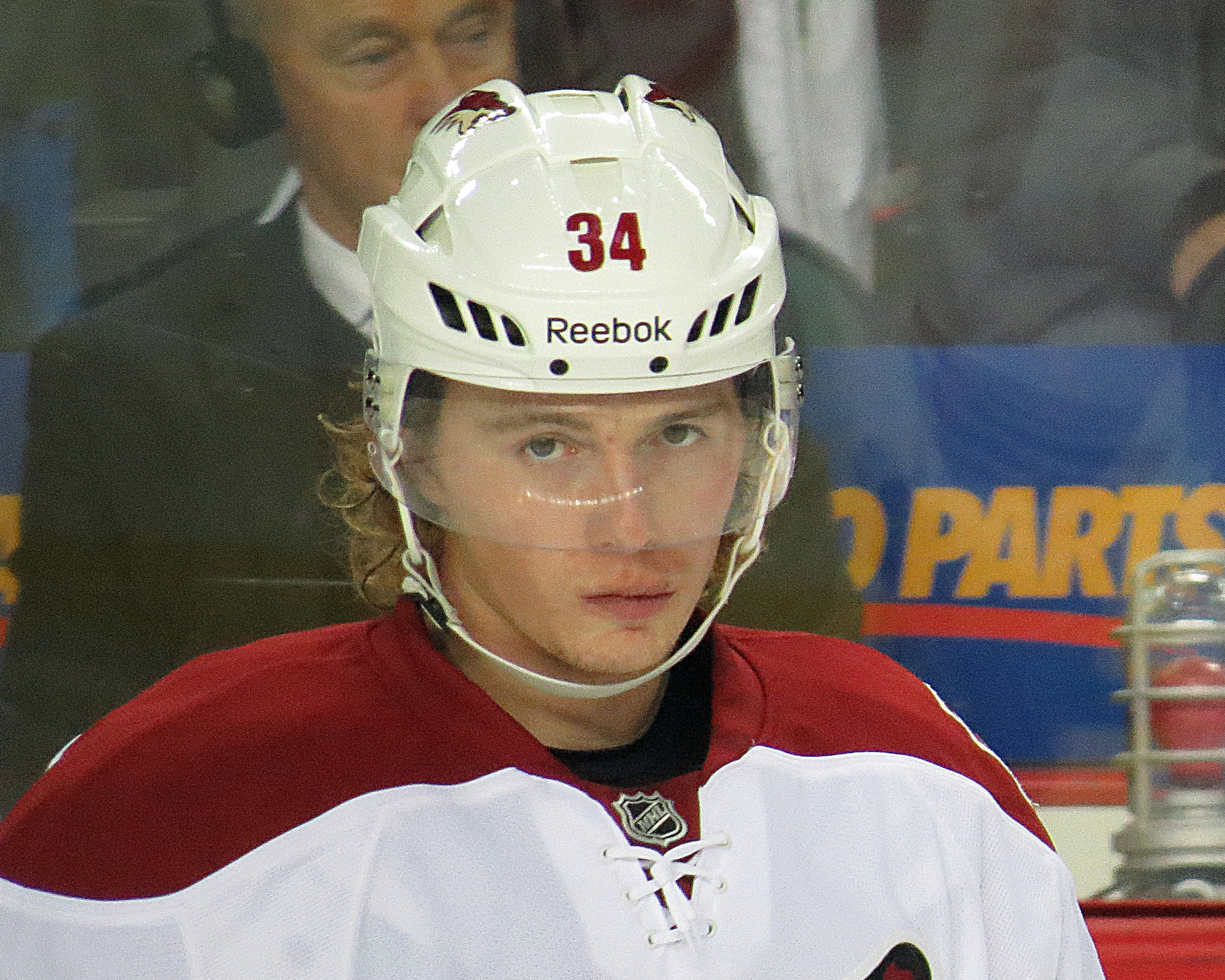
Tim Kennedy

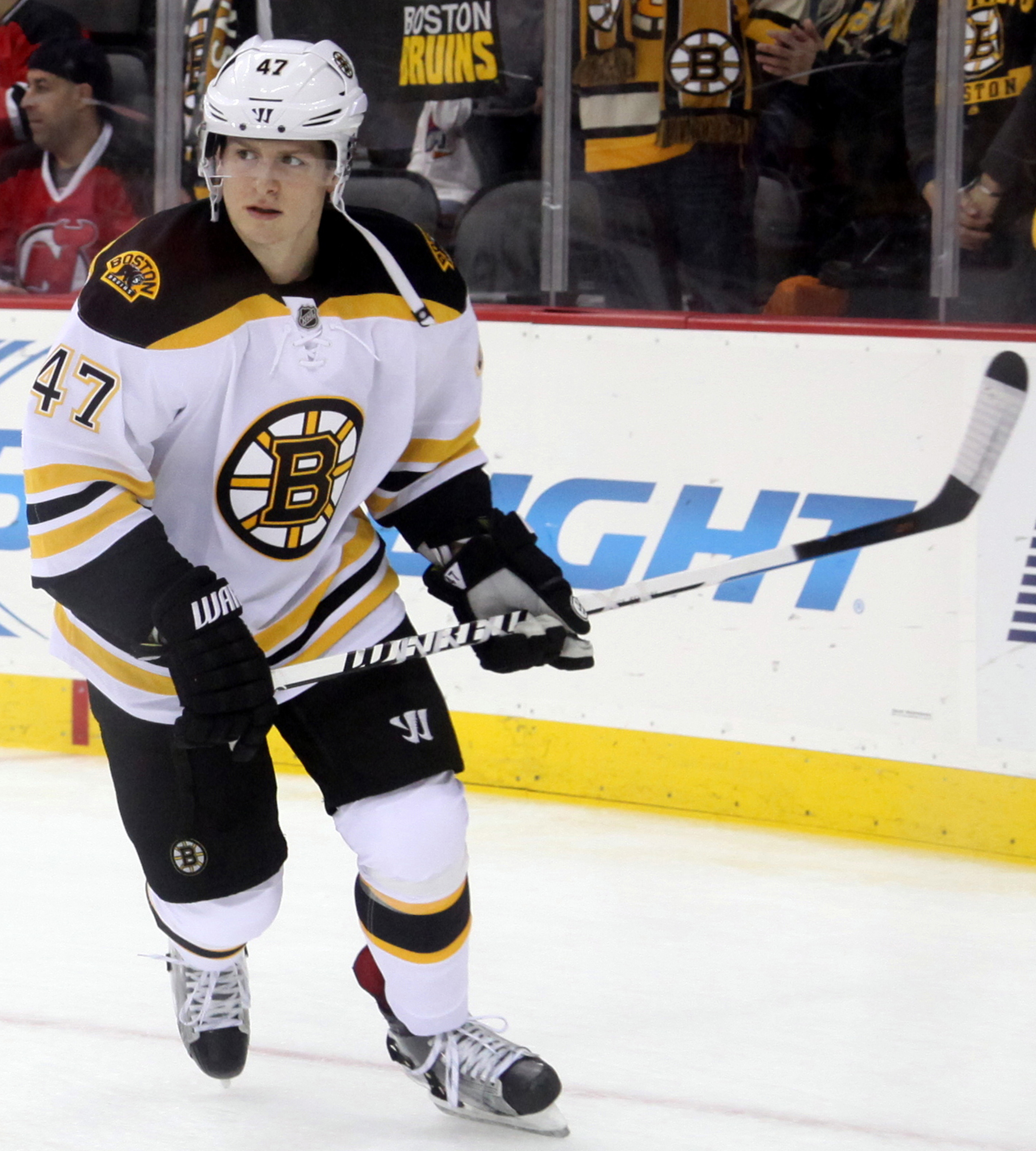
Torey Krug

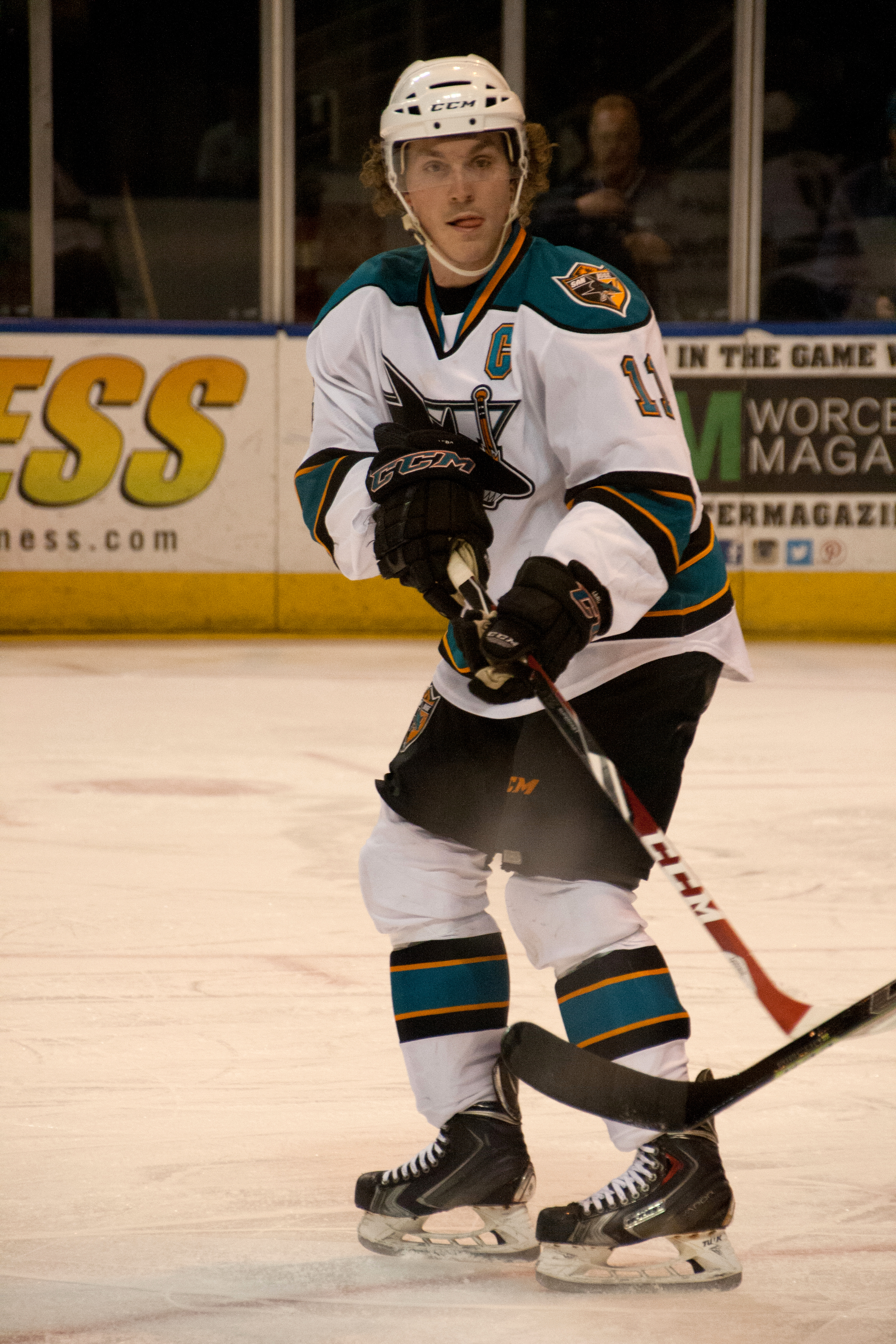
Bryan Lerg

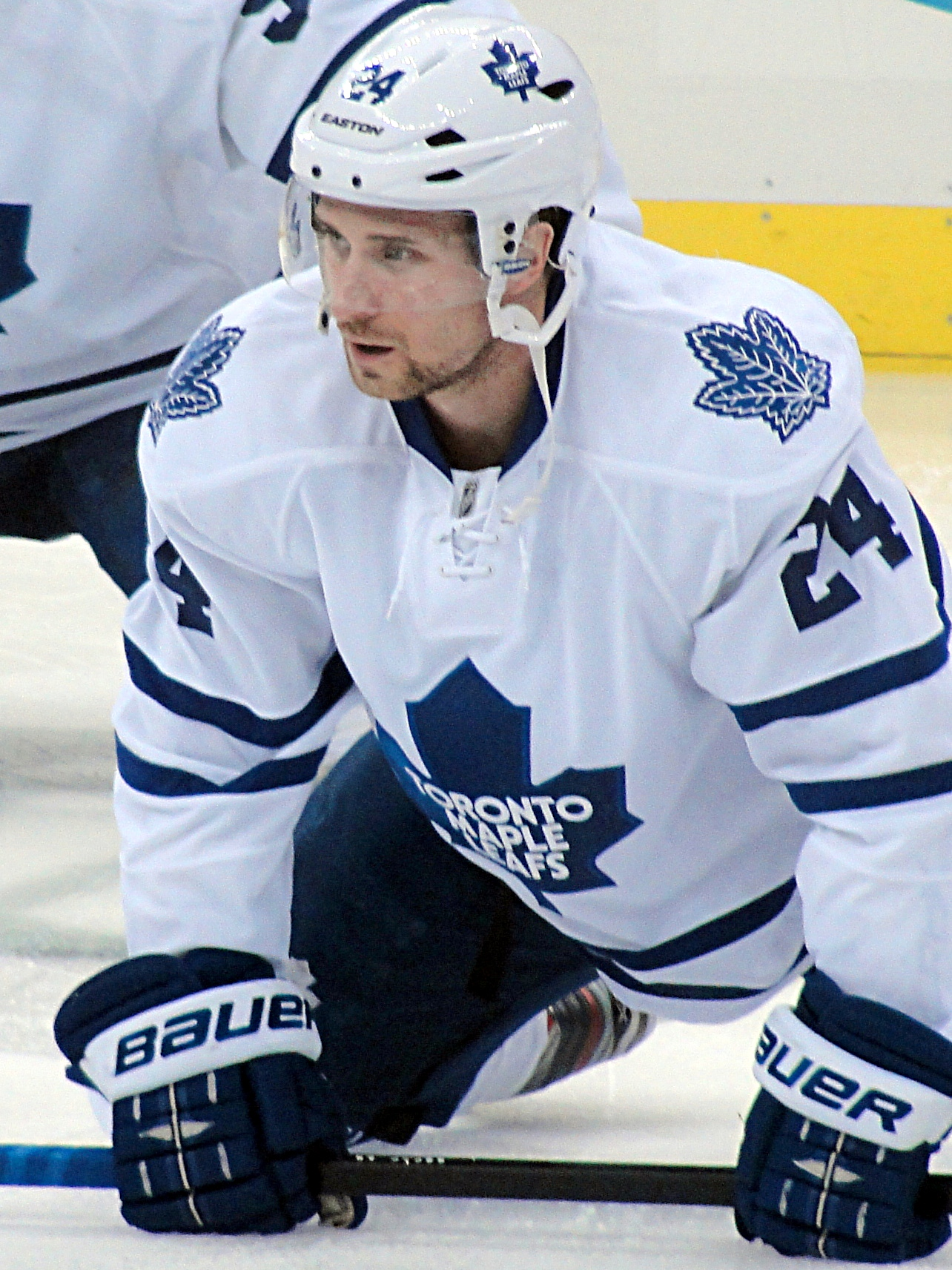
John-Michael Liles

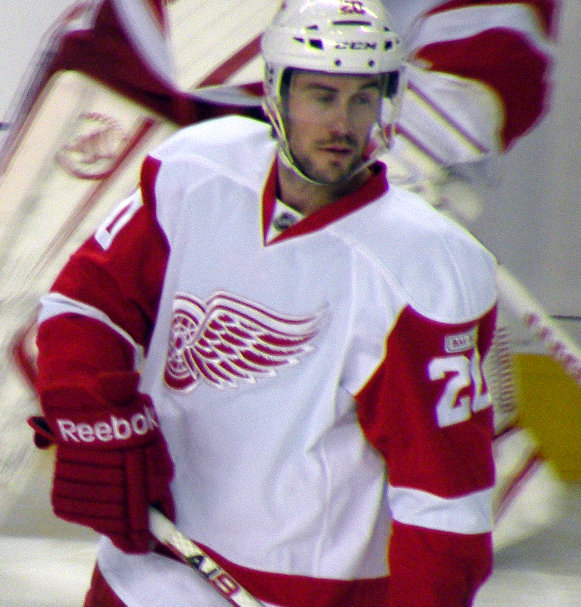
Drew Miller

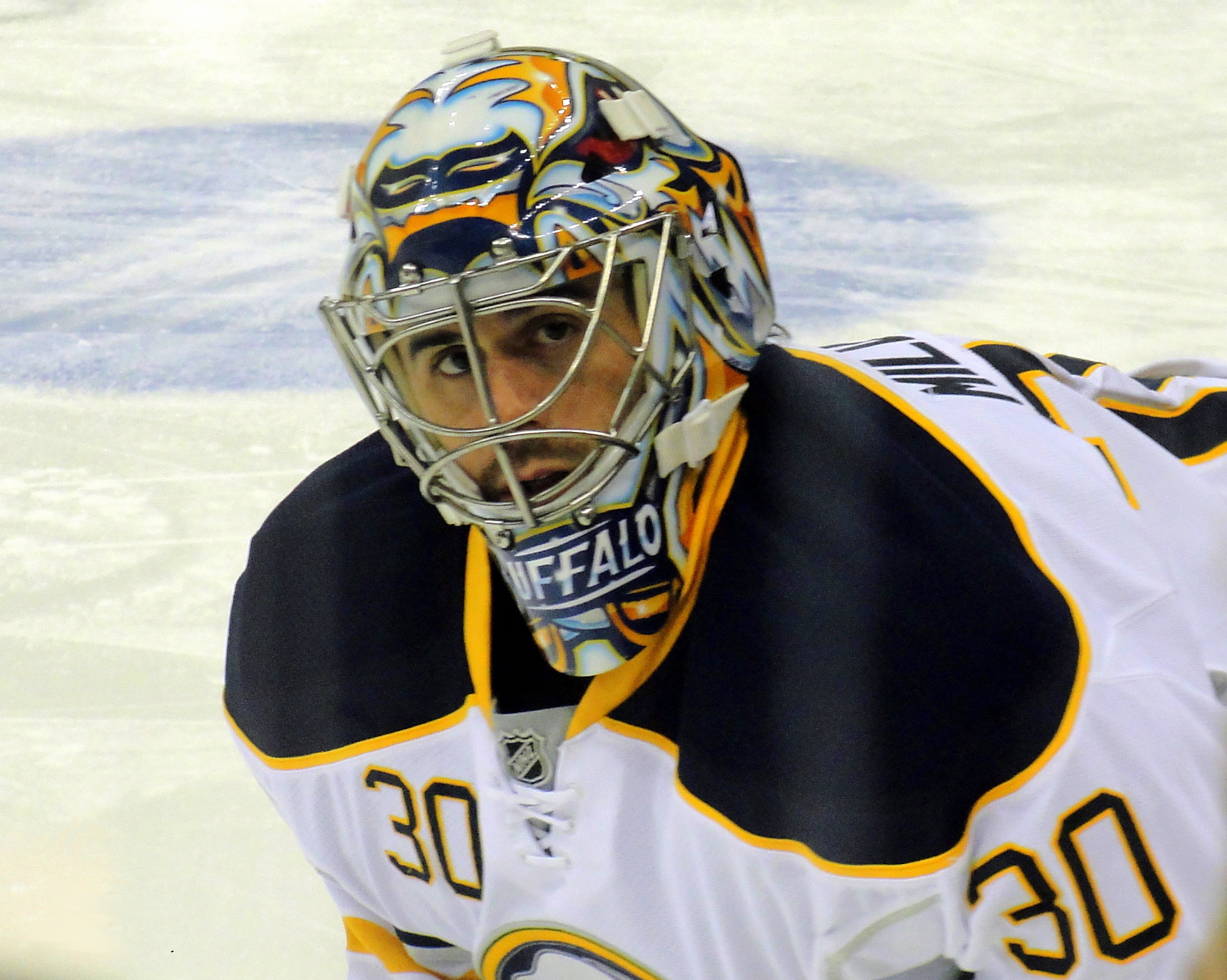
Ryan Miller

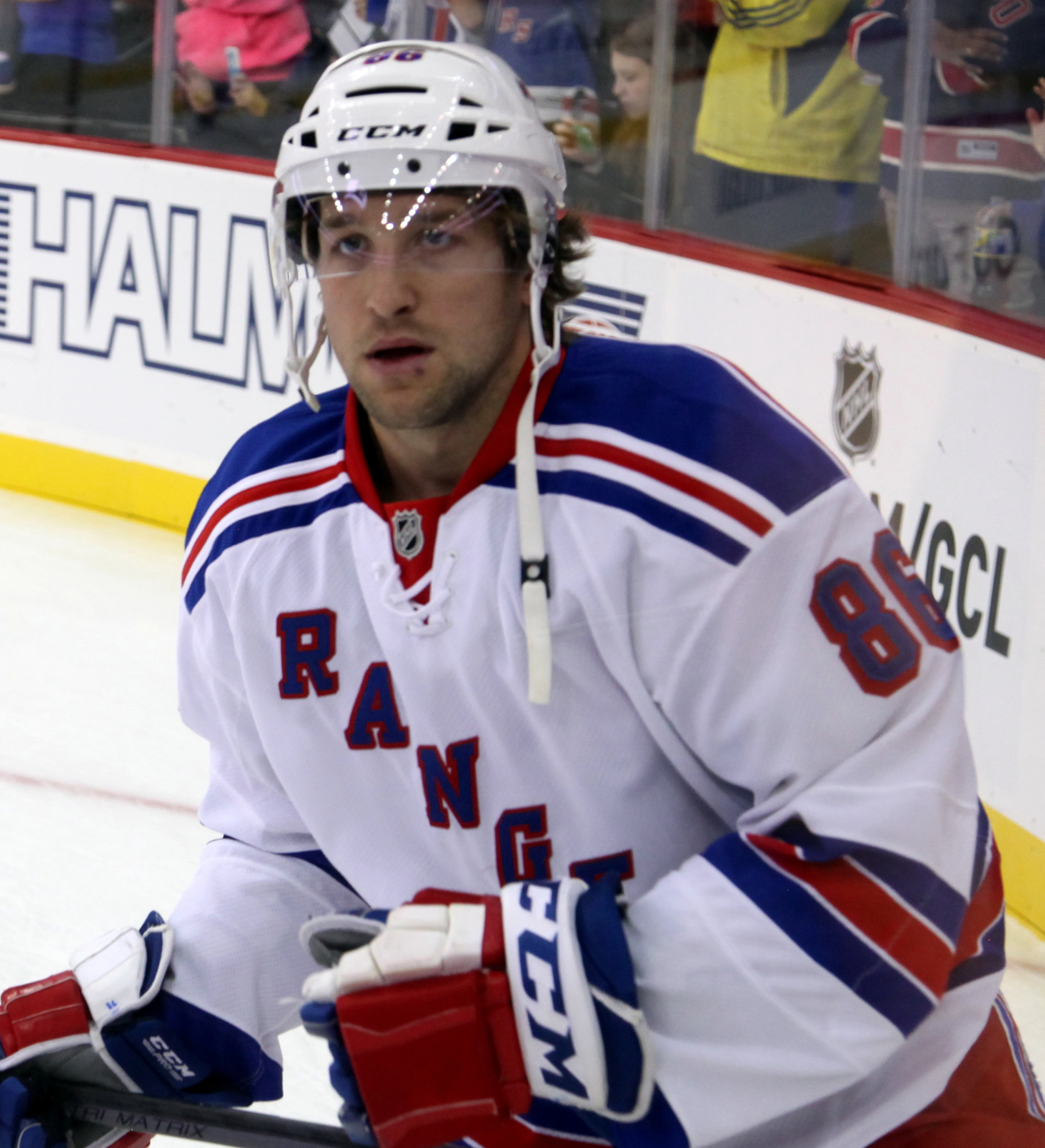
Chris Mueller

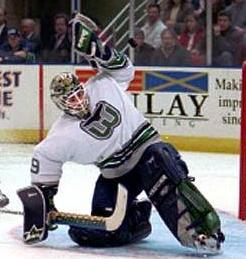
Jason Muzzatti

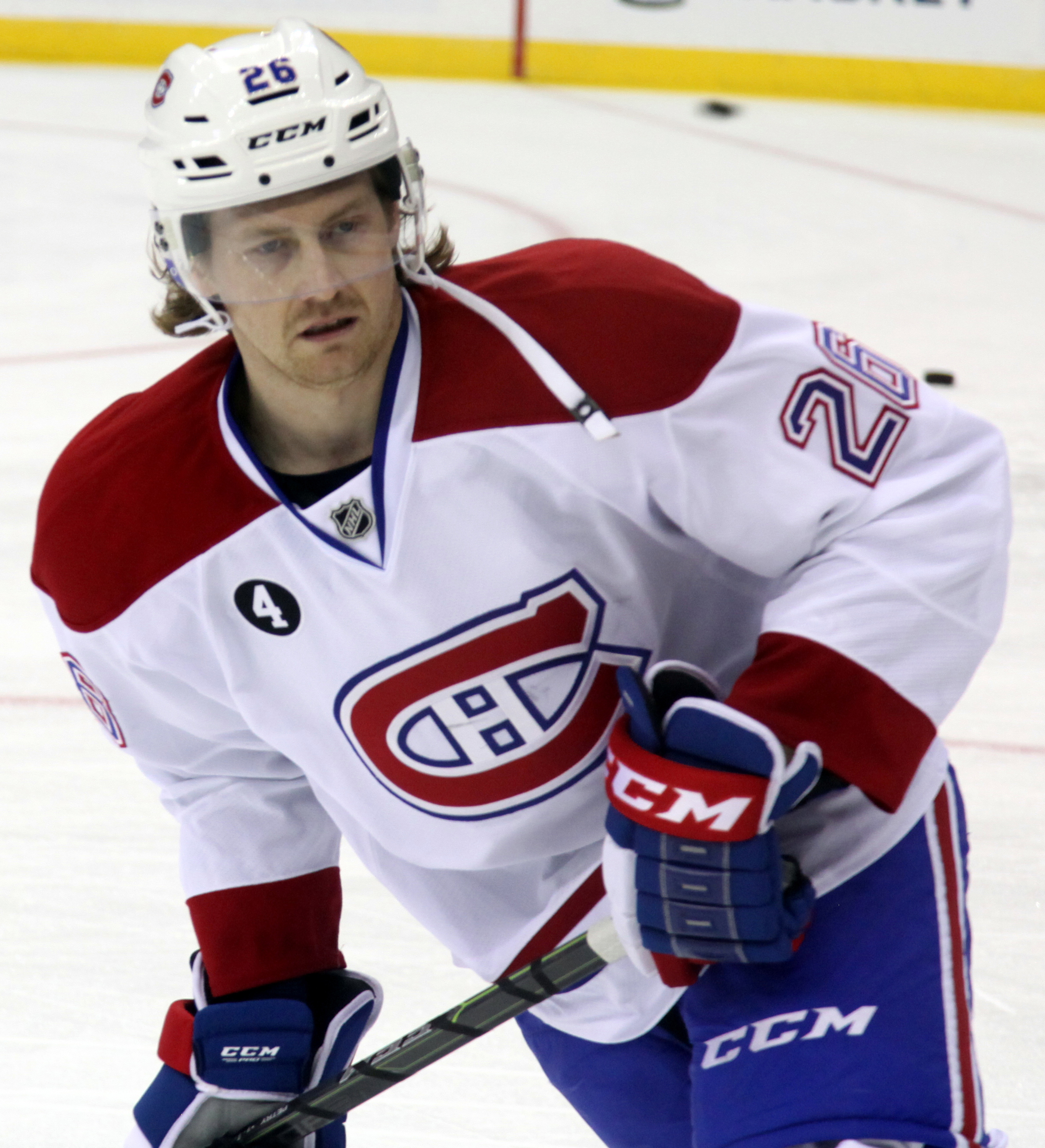
Jeff Petry

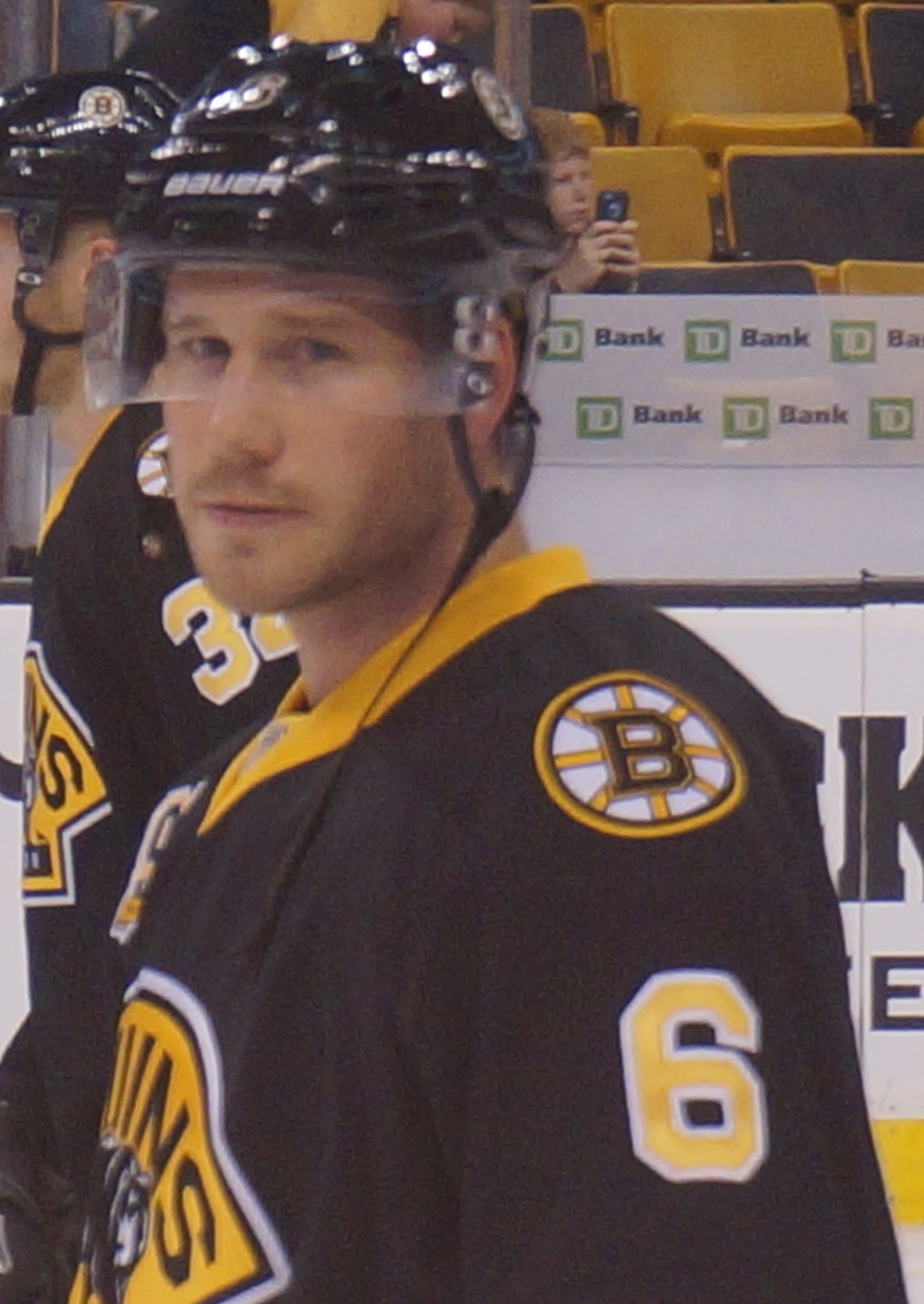
Corey Potter

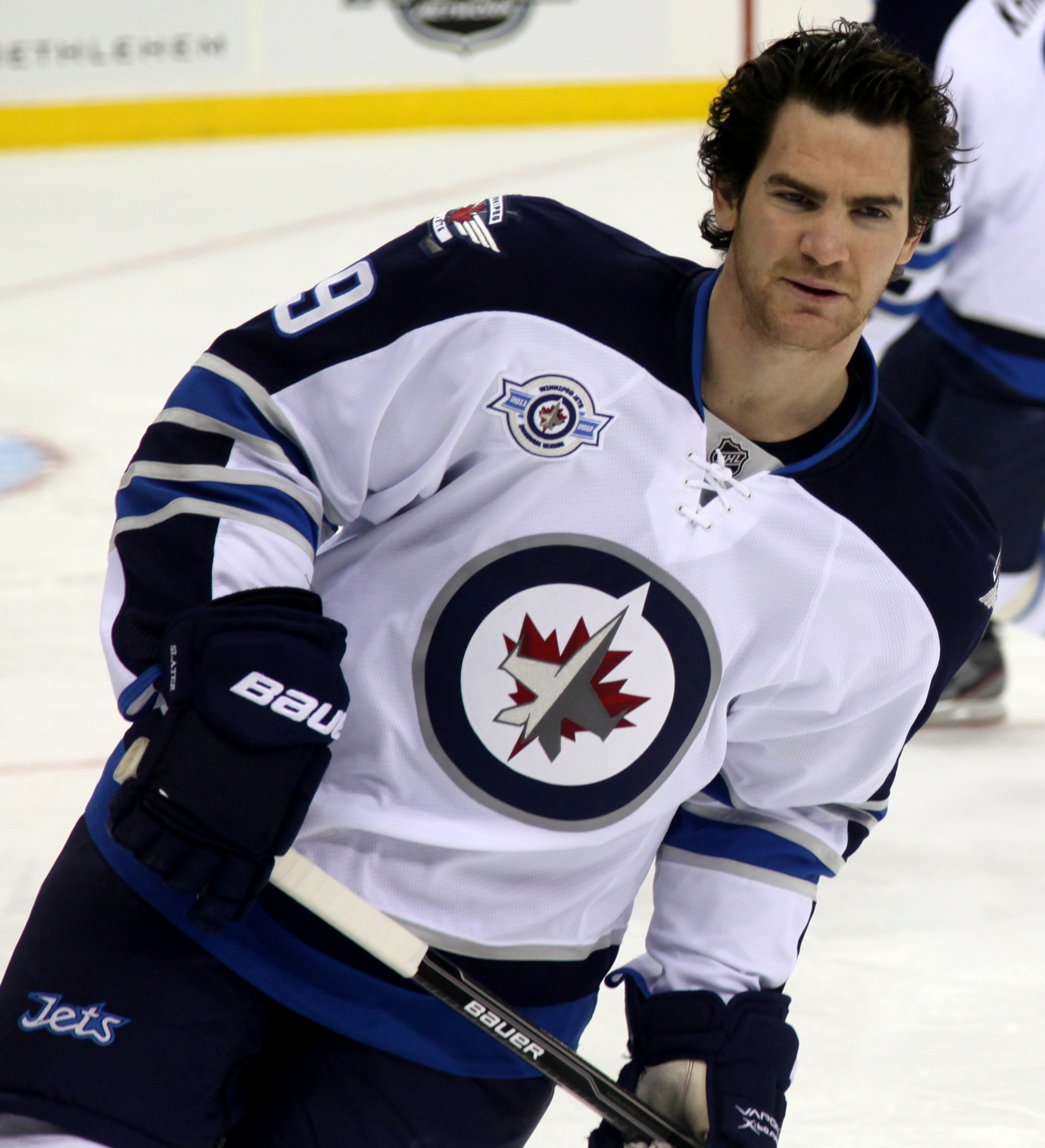
Jim Slater

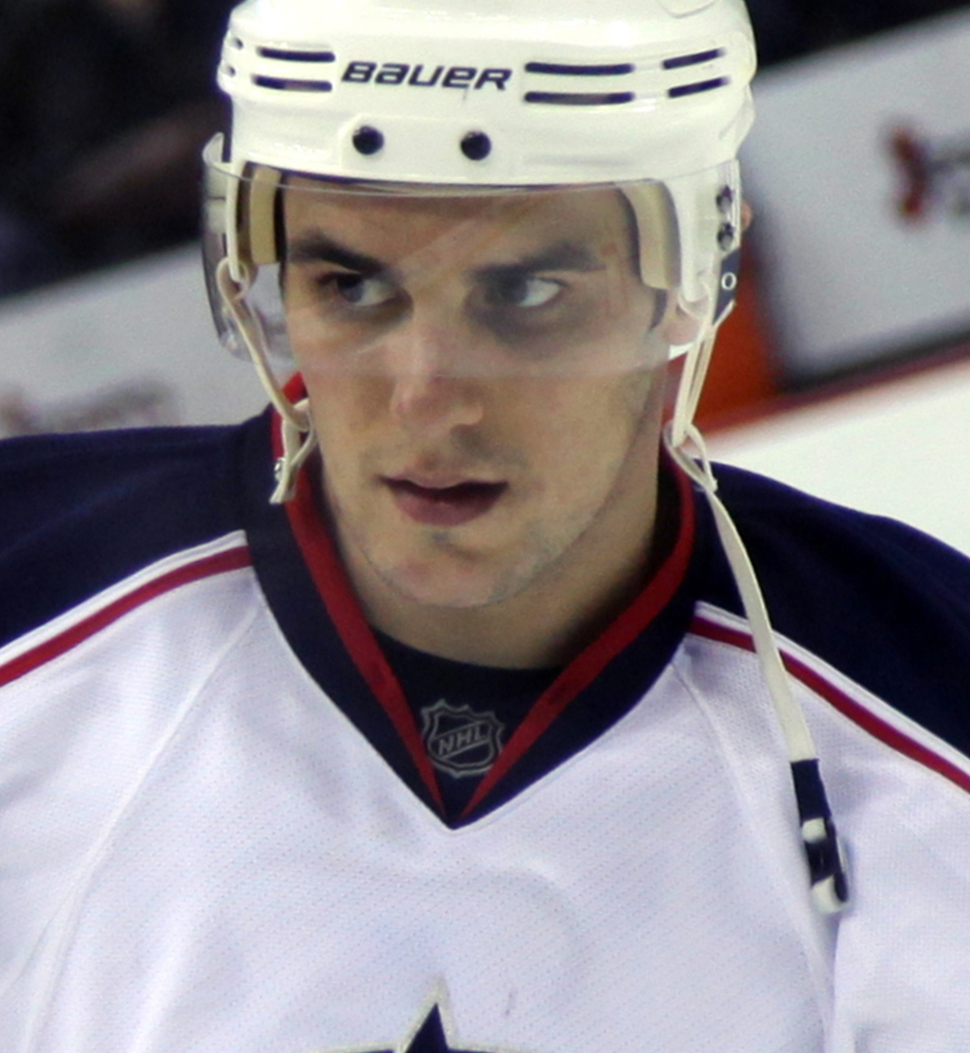
Corey Tropp

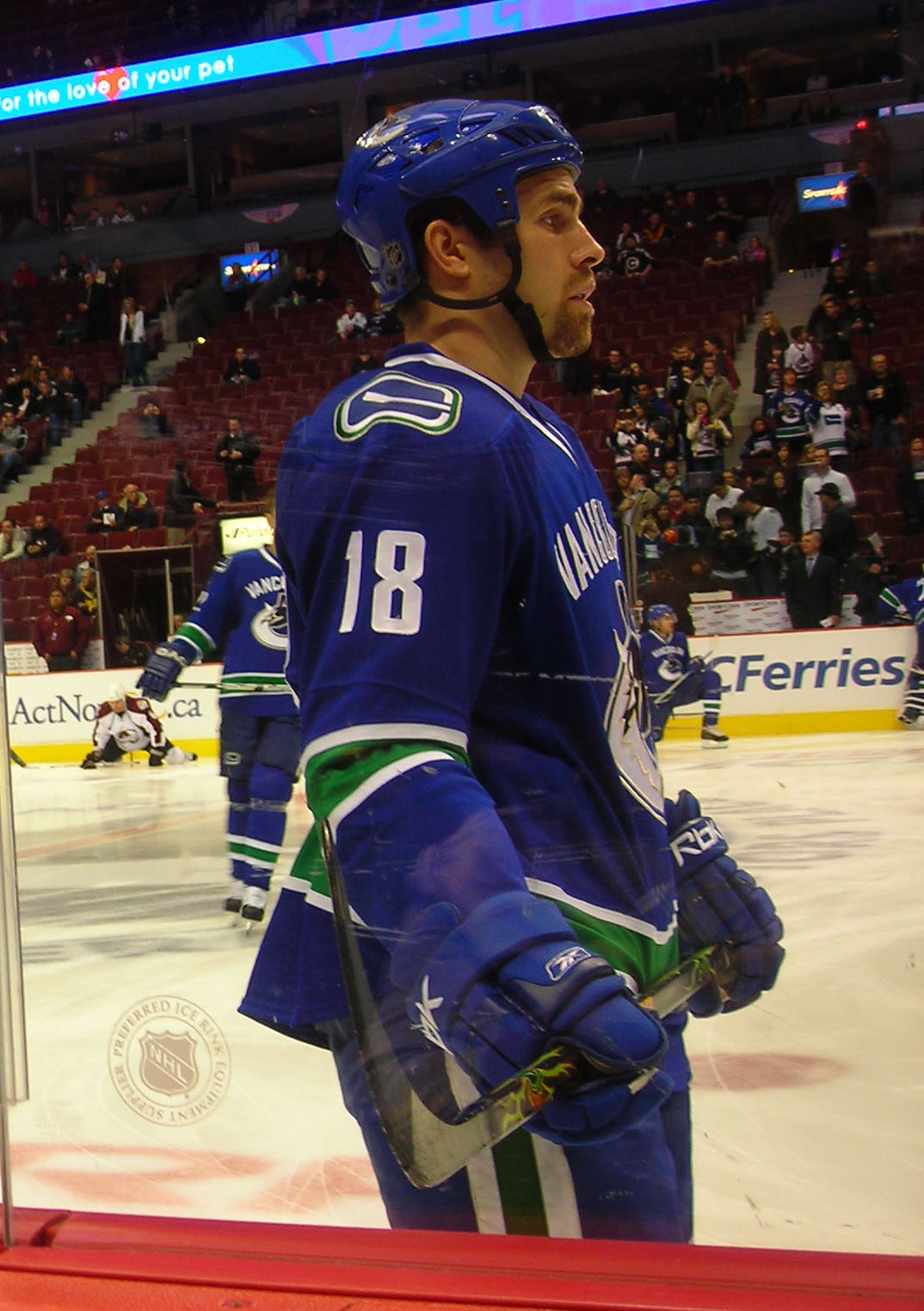
Mike Weaver

== Program records ==
The following are the Michigan State school records. Statistics are accurate as of the 2010–11 season.

Note: Italics indicate a player is still an active Spartan.

=== Career ===
- Most goals in a career: 138 Tom Ross (1972–76)
- Most assists in a career: 186 Tom Ross (1972–76)
- Most points in a career: 324 Tom Ross (1972–76)
- Most penalty minutes in a career: 466 Don Gibson (1986–90)
- Most points in a career, defenseman: 164 Steve Beadle (1986–90)
- Most wins in a career: 83 Jason Muzzatti (1987–91)
- Most shutouts in a career: Ryan Miller
- Most healthy scratches in a career: 48 David Bondra (2012–16)

=== Season ===
Players

- Most goals in a season: 59 Mike Donnelly 1985-86
- Most assists in a season: 60 Pat Murray 1989-90
- Most points in a season: 105 Tom Ross 1975-76
- Most penalty minutes in a season: 167 Don Gibson 1989-90
- Most points in a season, defenseman: 64 Norm Barnes (1973–74)
- Most points in a season, rookie:
- Most wins in a season: 32 Jason Muzzatti (1988–89)
- Most shutouts in a season: 4 Joe Selinger (1958–59)
- Most power play goals in a season (since 1975):

Team (since 1950)

- Most wins in a season: 38 1984-85
- Most WCHA wins in a season: 20 1975-76
- Most overtime games in a season: 11 (1991–92; 1986–87)
- Longest overall unbeaten streak: 22 (Dec. 29, 1984-Feb. 15, 1985)

=== Game ===
Player

- Most goals in a game: 5, Mike Donnelly vs. Ohio State (Dec. 14, 1985), Tom Ross vs. Notre Dame (Nov. 10, 1973), Don Thompson vs. Michigan (Feb 21, 1970), Bob Doyle vs. Ohio (Feb. 17, 1961)
- Most assists in a game: 6, Steve Colp vs. Michigan (Dec. 14, 1974), Daryl Rice vs. Boston College (Dec. 27, 1973), Real Turcotte vs. Ohio (Feb. 17, 1961)
- Most points in a game: 9, Bob Doyle vs. Ohio (Feb. 17, 1961), Real Turcotte vs. Ohio (Feb. 17, 1961)
- Most penalty minutes in a game: 21, Tony Tuzzolino vs. Western Michigan (Oct. 19, 1996)

Team

- Most goals in a game: 18 vs. Ohio State (Dec. 7, 1957)
- Most goals in a period: 8 vs. Ohio State (Dec. 7, 1957, 3rd)
- Most assists in a period: 14 vs. Ferris State (March 3, 1990, 2nd)
- Most penalty minutes in a game: 60 vs. Northeastern (Oct. 15, 1983)
- Most penalty minutes in a period: 53 vs. Ferris State (Dec. 16, 1988, 2nd)

== See also ==
Michigan State Spartans
