= Wooley =

Wooley is a surname. Notable people with the surname include:

- Bob Wooley (born 1947), American politician appointed to the New Mexico House of Representatives in 2011
- Charles Wooley (born 1948), Australian journalist, reporter and writer
- Gilbert Wooley (1896–1953), English cricketer
- J. Robert Wooley (born 1953), American lawyer and politician
- Jessica Wooley (born 1968), American politician
- Jimmy Wooley (born 1949), American judoka
- John Wooley (born 1949), American author and editor
- Karen L. Wooley, American polymer chemist and professor
- Michael W. Wooley, retired US Air Force lieutenant general
- Michael-Leon Wooley (born 1971), American actor and singer
- Pete Wooley (born 1929), former Canadian Football League player
- Sheb Wooley (1921–2003), American actor and singer
- Trevor Wooley (born 1964), British mathematician

== See also ==
- Wooley v. Maynard, a free speech Supreme Court case
- Woolley (disambiguation)
