= Steve Colp =

Canadian ice hockey player

- Born: July 27, 1954 (age 70); Toronto, Ontario, Canada
- Height: 5 ft 10 in (178 cm)
- Weight: 160 lb (73 kg; 11 st 6 lb)
- Position: Center
- Played for: Michigan State; Sioux City Musketeers
- NHL draft: 158th, 1974; Chicago Blackhawks
- WHA draft: 115th, 1974; Cleveland Crusaders
- Playing career: 1972–1977

Stephen Colp is a Canadian retired ice hockey center who was an All-American for Michigan State.

== Career ==
Colp played junior hockey for the Richmond Hill Rams, scoring 80 points in 42 games in 1972. He came to attention of Amo Bessone and was brought in to Michigan State with the 1972 recruiting class. Colp debuted for the Spartans as a freshman and promptly led MSU in both goals and points in his first season. For his second year, Colp teamed up with fellow sophomore Tom Ross and the two formed one of the most dynamic duos in college hockey history. Colp's numbers shot up more than half again as much and he led the nation in scoring with 97 points, setting a new program record. Colp was named an All-American for the year but despite the huge offensive numbers he and Ross produced, Michigan State was stuck in the middle of the WCHA standings. In the conference tournament that year, MSU narrowly missed an upset of top-seeded Michigan Tech but ultimately fell in the second round. After his stellar season, Colp was drafted in the later round of both the NHL and WHA Drafts.

Colp missed a significant number of games during his junior season due to injury and ended up seeing his point total nearly cut in half. He rebounded sharply in his senior season, finishing with 94 points but finished behind Ross for the team lead (105). That season, Ross and Colp combined for 91 goals, nearly half of the MSU offense, and helped the Spartans to a second-place finish in their conference. The team made the second round of the WCHA tournament and found themselves in a battle with Minnesota. After tying the first game 2–2 they ended regulation of the second match knotted at 6 each and it took three overtime periods to decide the winner. Despite firing 78 shots on goal, the Spartans ended up on the losing side. At the end of his college career, Colp had an astounding 300 points in 138 games. He is one of only 5 players to score 300 points at the top level of college hockey (as of 2021) but he is second for Michigan State behind his long-time teammate Tom Ross. Colp is also tied for second all-time with 53 power play goals, again with only Ross ahead of him.

After graduating, Colp played one season of senior hockey before retiring.

== Career statistics ==
=== Regular season and playoffs ===
			Regular Season					Playoffs
Season	Team	League	GP	G	A	Pts	PIM	GP	G	A	Pts	PIM
1971–72	Richmond Hill Rams	MTJHL	42	35	45	80	43	—	—	—	—	—
1972–73	Michigan State	WCHA	36	35	25	60	31	—	—	—	—	—
1973–74	Michigan State	WCHA	38	43	54	97	48	—	—	—	—	—
1974–75	Michigan State	WCHA	25	14	35	49	23	—	—	—	—	—
1975–76	Michigan State	WCHA	39	40	54	94	56	—	—	—	—	—
1976–77	Sioux City Musketeers	USHL	42	37	40	77	14	—	—	—	—	—
NCAA Totals			138	132	168	300	158	—	—	—	—	—

== Awards and honors ==
Award	Year
All-WCHA First Team	1973–74
AHCA West All-American	1973–74
All-WCHA Second Team	1975–76

Awards and achievements
Preceded by Rick Kennedy	NCAA Ice Hockey Scoring Champion; 1973–74	Succeeded by Tom Ross
