= Gary Haight =

American ice hockey player

- Born: October 4, 1961 (age 65) Edmonds, Washington, U.S.
- Height: 5 ft 11 in (180 cm)
- Weight: 168 lb (76 kg; 12 st 0 lb)
- Position: Defenseman
- Shot: Left
- Played for: Michigan State
- National team: United States
- Playing career: 1980–1985

Gary Haight is an American former ice hockey defenseman who was an All-American for Michigan State.

== Career ==
Haight began attending Michigan State University in the fall of 1980, a member of Ron Mason's second recruiting class for the Spartans. MSU had a rather poor year in Haight's freshman year, finishing last in the WCHA and failing to qualify for postseason play. That offseason, Michigan State was one of four programs to leave the WCHA and join the CCHA. The change in scenery helped revive the Spartans and the team nearly won the regular season conference title in their first year. Haight's scoring production saw a big jump but it was his defensive prowess that attracted attention. Michigan State was the #2 defensive team in the country, allowing less than 3 goals per game and used their newfound success to win the conference tournament and return to the NCAA Tournament for the first time in 15 years. Haight's junior season saw nearly the same outcome as MSU was again second in the CCHA and second in the nation defensively. They won their second consecutive CCHA championship and lost in the NCAA quarterfinal round for the second straight year.

After the season, Haight was invited to participate in the 1983 Ice Hockey World Championships. He helped the United States go undefeated in pool B and earn a promotion to the top division. However, the next world championships wouldn't happen for two years because the 1984 Winter Olympics were up next. Due to Haight's performance in 1983, he was invited to remain with the team and accepted. He spent the next year with the US national team but didn't end up playing in Sarajevo, though he was a member of the team. The defending champion US finished a very disappointing 7th and Height returned to Michigan State the next year.

MSU hadn't broken stride in Haight's absence, but upon his return the team performed even better. In 1985 the Spartans won the regular season CCHA title for the first time and were by far and away the best defensive team in the country (100 goals against in 44 games) Haight was named as an All-American and Haight helped the team to their fourth consecutive CCHA championship and the team received the top western seed in the 1985 NCAA Tournament. Unfortunately, the Spartans lost in the quarterfinals to an upstart Providence squad. Haight played 2 games for the national team at the 1985 Ice Hockey World Championships and then retired as a player.

He spent the next year back home in Seattle and worked for HRC Trucks. He returned to East Lansing once more to complete his degree in transportation management then went back to work for HRC. He became the fleet operations manager for the west coast in 1990 and remained in that position for 15 years.

== Statistics ==
=== Regular season and playoffs ===
			Regular Season					Playoffs
Season	Team	League	GP	G	A	Pts	PIM	GP	G	A	Pts	PIM
1978–79	West Kelowna Warriors	BCJHL	56	6	19	25	93	—	—	—	—	—
1978–79	Seattle Breakers	WHL	19	0	8	8	31	—	—	—	—	—
1979–80	Seattle Breakers	WHL	69	1	21	22	83	12	0	4	4	30
1980–81	Michigan State	WCHA	36	5	17	22	64	—	—	—	—	—
1981–82	Michigan State	CCHA	40	9	33	42	75	—	—	—	—	—
1982–83	Michigan State	CCHA	40	6	24	30	52	—	—	—	—	—
1984–85	Michigan State	CCHA	44	7	26	33	46	—	—	—	—	—
NCAA totals			160	27	100	127	237	—	—	—	—	—

=== International ===
Year	Team	Event	Result	GP	G	A	Pts	PIM
1983	United States	WC-B	1st	—	—	—	—	—
1983–84	United States	International	—	—	—	—	—	—
1984	United States	Olympics	7th	0	0	0	0	0
1985	United States	WC	4th	2	0	2	2	0

== Awards and honors ==
Award	Year
All-CCHA First Team	1984–85
AHCA West Second-Team All-American	1984–85
