= Harold Paulsen =

American ice hockey player and coach

Harold W. "Babe" Paulsen (March 3, 1919, in Virginia, Minnesota – May 11, 2010, in Mankato, Minnesota) was a former collegiate ice hockey player and head coach.

Paulsen played hockey at the University of Minnesota from 1938 to 1941 and was an All-American in 1940 at left wing alongside teammate John Mariucci. He was team captain as a senior in 1940-1941, finishing his career as Gopher hockey's all-time leading scorer, a record that would hold for the next 15 years. He was selected for the 1940 U.S. Olympic Hockey team, but due to World War II those games were cancelled.

With boyish looks, and a small stature, Paulsen earned the nickname "Babe" during his playing days in high school and college.

Following college, Paulsen signed a professional contract with the Chicago Black Hawks, but never made it to Chicago. He coached the Roseau High School Rams varsity hockey team before joining the Navy during World War II. Paulsen returned to Minnesota after the war and completed a master's degree in education. He coached the varsity ice hockey program at Thief River Falls High School.

Paulsen was hired as the first varsity ice hockey coach at Michigan State University on August 1, 1948. Before recruiting or coaching, Paulsen oversaw the renovation of Demonstration Hall into an indoor rink with artificial ice-making capabilities. Paulsen struggled through his first two years at Michigan State with a 6–25 record. MSU athletic director Ralph H. Young felt the hockey program's progress was inadequate and Paulsen resigned after the 1951 season.

Following his coaching career, Paulsen earned a doctorate in physical education from the University of Michigan. He continued teaching health education courses at Michigan State. In 1956 he left Michigan State to become athletic director at Slippery Rock State Teachers College in Pennsylvania, now Slippery Rock University. Paulsen moved on to teach physical education at Mankato State College, now Minnesota State University, Mankato, until his retirement in 1988.

In 2001, Paulsen was among 50 former Gopher hockey players honored by the University of Minnesota as "Legends on Ice."

Paulsen's last name is commonly misspelled Paulson in many hockey publications.

== Head coaching record ==
Statistics overview
Season	Team	Overall	Conference	Standing	Postseason
Michigan State Spartans Independent (1949–1951)
1949-50	Michigan State	0-14-0			
1950-51	Michigan State	6-11-0			
Total:		6-25-0			
National champion Postseason invitational champion Conference regular season champion Conference regular season and conference tournament champion Division regular season champion Division regular season and conference tournament champion Conference tournament champion
