= John Woolley =

John Woolley may refer to:

- John Woolley (educator) (1816–1866), professor and clergyman; first principal of the University of Sydney, Australia
- John G. Woolley (1850–1922), lawyer and public speaker; Prohibition Party's candidate for President of the United States in the election of 1900
- John W. Woolley (1831–1928), American Latter Day Saint and one of the founders of the Mormon fundamentalism movement
- John Woolley (sport shooter) (born 1950), New Zealand sport shooter
- John Woolley (general) (1824–1873), American Union Civil War brevet brigadier general.
- John Woolley (footballer) (born 1935), Australian rules footballer
- Jack Woolley (footballer) (1886–1957), Australian rules footballer

== See also ==
- John Wooley (born 1949), American author
