= Jason Woolley =

Canadian ice hockey player

- Born: July 27, 1969 (age 57) Toronto, Ontario, Canada
- Height: 6 ft 0 in (183 cm)
- Weight: 198 lb (90 kg; 14 st 2 lb)
- Position: Defence
- Shot: Left
- Played for: Washington Capitals; Florida Panthers; Pittsburgh Penguins; Buffalo Sabres; Detroit Red Wings; Malmö Redhawks
- National team: Canada
- NHL draft: 61st overall, 1989; Washington Capitals
- Playing career: 1991–2007

Jason Douglas Woolley (born July 27, 1969) is a Canadian former professional ice hockey defenceman. He played in the National Hockey League for the Washington Capitals, Florida Panthers, Pittsburgh Penguins, Buffalo Sabres, and Detroit Red Wings.

== Playing career ==
As a youth, Woolley played in the 1981 and 1982 Quebec International Pee-Wee Hockey Tournaments with a minor ice hockey team from Mississauga.

Woolley attended Michigan State University in East Lansing, MI before the Washington Capitals selected him 61st overall in the 1989 NHL Draft. Woolley's most productive NHL season was his 1998–99 campaign with the Buffalo Sabres in which he netted 10 goals and 33 assists (43 points). Fittingly, that year was also Woolley's finest playoff performance (4 goals, 11 assists, 15 points) as his Sabres advanced to the Stanley Cup Finals before falling to the Dallas Stars in six games. Woolley scored a dramatic game-winning OT goal in Game 1 of that series, labelled as "the shot heard round the hockey world" by Sabres announcer Rick Jeanneret.

Following a torn ACL to defenseman Jiri Fischer in November 2002, the Red Wings acquired Woolley from the Sabres for a conditional draft pick. During Woolley's tenure with the Red Wings, they would play Sam the Sham & the Pharaoh's Woolly Bully when he scored at Joe Louis Arena. Woolley was also a participant in the 2014 Bridgestone NHL Alumni Winter Showdown at Comerica Park on December 31, 2013, representing the Detroit Red Wings.

== International play ==
Medal record

Representing Canada

Ice hockey

Olympic Games
Silver medal – second place	1992 Albertville	

He played for Canada at the 1992 Winter Olympics. Woolley recorded five assists in eight games with the team, scored a shootout goal, and won a silver medal.

== Personal ==
Woolley now operates The Players Group Hockey, a player agency based in Birmingham, Michigan.

== Career statistics ==
=== Regular season and playoffs ===
			Regular season					Playoffs
Season	Team	League	GP	G	A	Pts	PIM	GP	G	A	Pts	PIM
1986–87	St. Michael's Buzzers	MetJHL	35	13	22	35	40	—	—	—	—	—
1987–88	St. Michael's Buzzers	MetJHL	31	19	37	56	22	—	—	—	—	—
1988–89	Michigan State Spartans	CCHA	47	12	25	37	26	—	—	—	—	—
1989–90	Michigan State Spartans	CCHA	45	10	38	48	26	—	—	—	—	—
1990–91	Michigan State Spartans	CCHA	40	15	44	59	24	—	—	—	—	—
1991–92	Canada	Intl	60	14	30	44	36	—	—	—	—	—
1991–92	Baltimore Skipjacks	AHL	15	1	10	11	6	—	—	—	—	—
1991–92	Washington Capitals	NHL	1	0	0	0	0	—	—	—	—	—
1992–93	Washington Capitals	NHL	26	0	2	2	10	—	—	—	—	—
1992–93	Baltimore Skipjacks	AHL	29	14	27	41	22	1	0	2	2	0
1993–94	Washington Capitals	NHL	10	1	2	3	4	4	1	0	1	4
1993–94	Portland Pirates	AHL	41	12	29	41	14	9	2	2	4	4
1994–95	Detroit Vipers	IHL	48	8	28	36	38	—	—	—	—	—
1994–95	Florida Panthers	NHL	34	4	9	13	18	—	—	—	—	—
1995–96	Florida Panthers	NHL	52	6	28	34	32	13	2	6	8	14
1996–97	Florida Panthers	NHL	3	0	0	0	2	—	—	—	—	—
1996–97	Pittsburgh Penguins	NHL	57	6	30	36	28	5	0	3	3	0
1997–98	Buffalo Sabres	NHL	71	9	26	35	35	15	2	9	11	12
1998–99	Buffalo Sabres	NHL	80	10	33	43	62	21	4	11	15	10
1999–00	Buffalo Sabres	NHL	74	8	25	33	52	5	0	2	2	2
2000–01	Buffalo Sabres	NHL	67	5	18	23	46	8	1	5	6	2
2001–02	Buffalo Sabres	NHL	59	8	20	28	34	—	—	—	—	—
2002–03	Buffalo Sabres	NHL	14	0	3	3	29	—	—	—	—	—
2002–03	Detroit Red Wings	NHL	62	6	17	23	22	4	1	0	1	0
2003–04	Detroit Red Wings	NHL	55	4	15	19	28	4	0	0	0	0
2004–05	Flint Generals	UHL	9	4	2	6	4	—	—	—	—	—
2005–06	Detroit Red Wings	NHL	53	1	18	19	28	—	—	—	—	—
2006–07	Malmö IF	SEL	31	1	5	6	46	—	—	—	—	—
NHL totals			718	68	246	314	430	79	11	36	47	44

=== International ===
Year	Team	Event	Result	GP	G	A	Pts	PIM
1992	Canada	OG	2nd place, silver medalist(s)	8	0	5	5	4
1992	Canada	WC	8th	6	1	2	3	2
Senior totals				14	1	7	8	6

== Awards and honours ==
Award	Year
College
All-CCHA Rookie Team	1988–89
All-CCHA First Team	1990–91
AHCA West First-Team All-American	1990–91

Awards and achievements
Preceded by Rob Blake	CCHA Best Offensive Defenseman; 1990–91	Succeeded by Mark Astley
