= Tom Ross (ice hockey, born 1954) =

American ice hockey player

- Born: January 17, 1954 (age 72) Detroit, Michigan, U.S.
- Height: 5 ft 9 in (175 cm)
- Weight: 170 lb (77 kg; 12 st 2 lb)
- Position: Center
- Shot: Left
- Played for: AHL; Adirondack Red Wings; IHL; Port Huron Flags; Kalamazoo Wings CHL; Kansas City Red Wings
- NHL draft: Undrafted
- Playing career: 1976–1980

Tom Ross (born January 17, 1954) is an American former professional ice hockey centre.

== Early life ==
Ross was born in Detroit, Michigan. Prior to turning professional, he played four years (1972–76) of NCAA hockey with Michigan State University. He is the all-time leader in career points at the Division I level with 324 points in 115 games played.

== Career ==
As a professional, Ross played 216 games in the IHL with the Port Huron Flags (1976–77) and the Kalamazoo Wings (1977–80). He also played one game in the CHL with the Kansas City Red Wings, and three games in the AHL with the Adirondack Red Wings.

== Awards and honors ==
Award	Year
All-WCHA Second Team	1973–74
All-WCHA First Team	1974–75
AHCA West All-American	1974–75
All-WCHA First Team	1975–76
AHCA West All-American	1975–76

Awards and achievements
Preceded by Doug Palazzari	WCHA Most Valuable Player; 1974–75 (With Mike Polich)	Succeeded by Mike Zuke
Preceded by Steve Colp	NCAA Ice Hockey Scoring Champion; 1974–75, 1975–76	Succeeded by Dave Taylor
