= John Woolley (footballer) =

Australian rules footballer

Personal information
- Full name: John Graham Woolley
- Born: 19 July 1935
- Died: 3 January 2004 (aged 68); Wynnum, Queensland
- Original team: Bayswater
- Height: 193 cm (6 ft 4 in)
- Weight: 87 kg (192 lb)

Playing career^{1}
Years	Club	Games (Goals)
1955, 1960–62	South Melbourne	25 (0)
- ^{1} Playing statistics correct to the end of 1962.

John Graham Woolley (19 July 1935 – 3 January 2004) was an Australian rules footballer who played with South Melbourne in the Victorian Football League (VFL).
