= Jack Woolley (footballer) =

Australian rules footballer (1886–1957)

Personal information
- Full name: John Woolley
- Born: 15 January 1886; Tyabb, Victoria
- Died: 20 November 1957 (aged 71); Tyabb, Victoria
- Original team: South Yarra
- Height: 182 cm (6 ft 0 in)
- Weight: 86 kg (190 lb)

Playing career^{1}
Years	Club	Games (Goals)
1913–14	Essendon	9 (5)
1914	Melbourne	2 (2)
1918–19	Carlton	12 (7)
Total		23 (14)
- ^{1} Playing statistics correct to the end of 1919.

John Woolley (15 January 1886 – 20 November 1957) was an Australian rules footballer who played with Essendon, Melbourne and Carlton in the Victorian Football League (VFL) and Hawthorn, Northcote and Preston in the Victorian Football Association (VFA).
