= Ice hockey at the 2017 Asian Winter Games =

- Venue: Mikaho Gymnasium; Tsukisamu Gymnasium; Hoshioki Skating Rink
- Dates: 18–26 February 2017
- Competitors: 515 from 18 nations

Ice hockey at the 2017 Asian Winter Games was held in Sapporo, Japan between 18–26 February at three venues (Tsukisamu Gymnasium, Mikaho Gymnasium and the Hoshioki Skating Rink).

A total of 18 men's teams competed in three divisions (four in Top Division, six in Division I and eight in Division II), along with six women's teams. Originally 20 men's teams were scheduled to compete, however Bahrain withdrew. Iran was also scheduled to compete, however after arriving, more than half the team was deemed ineligible to represent the country due to eligibility issues. Thus the team was disqualified. However the country still played its matches as friendlies, but they did not count towards the standings.

== Schedule ==
●	Classification	●	Round	●	Last round

Event↓/Date →	18th Sat	19th Sun	20th Mon	21st Tue	22nd Wed	23rd Thu	24th Fri	25th Sat	26th Sun
Men	●		●	●	●	●	●	●	●
Women	●		●	●		●		●	

== Medalists ==
Event	Gold	Silver	Bronze
Men	Kazakhstan; Anton Kazantsev; Georgiy Dulnev; Madiyar Ibraibekov; Alexandr Kurshuk; Artemiy Lakiza; Kirill Savitskiy; Anton Sagadeyev; Nikita Mikhailis; Ilya Kovzalov; Alexey Antsiferov; Stanislav Zinchenko; Yaroslav Yevdokimov; Alikhan Assetov; Konstantin Savenkov; Ilgiz Nuriyev; Sergey Kudryavtsev; Nursultan Belgibayev; Ivan Stepanenko; Anton Petrov; Maxim Volkov; Dmitriy Grents; Vitaliy Kolesnik	South Korea; Matt Dalton; Seo Yeong-jun; Bryan Young; Kim Won-jun; Kim Yoon-hwan; Cho Min-ho; Michael Swift; Kim Ki-sung; Oh Hyon-ho; Jeon Jung-woo; Shin Sang-woo; Lee Don-ku; Shin Sang-hoon; Kim Won-jung; Kim Sang-wook; Lee Chong-hyun; Park Jin-kyu; Mike Testwuide; Eric Regan; Park Woo-sang; Shin Hyung-yun; Park Kye-hoon; Park Sung-je	Japan; Takuto Onoda; Mei Ushu; Keigo Minoshima; Ryo Hashiba; Ryo Hashimoto; Seiji Takahashi; Kenta Takagi; Takuma Kawai; Masahito Nishiwaki; Hiroto Sato; Hiromichi Terao; Go Tanaka; Kohei Mitamura; Makuru Furuhashi; Takafumi Yamashita; Shuhei Kuji; Yuri Terao; Yosuke Haga; Yushiro Hirano; Hiroki Ueno; Takuro Yamashita; Yutaka Fukufuji; Yuto Ito
Women	Japan; Nana Fujimoto; Shiori Koike; Ayaka Toko; Sena Suzuki; Mika Hori; Akane Hosoyamada; Aina Takeuchi; Haruna Yoneyama; Yurie Adachi; Chiho Osawa; Moeko Fujimoto; Haruka Toko; Rui Ukita; Naho Terashima; Hanae Kubo; Tomomi Iwahara; Ami Nakamura; Yoshino Enomoto; Shoko Ono; Mai Kondo; Akane Konishi	China; He Siye; Yu Baiwei; Zhu Rui; Tian Naiyuan; Liu Zhixin; Zhang Mengying; Deng Di; Zhang Chi; Ju Jingwen; Lu Shuang; Wang Chang; Zhao Qinan; Guan Yingying; Kong Minghui; Jiang Bowen; Lü Yue; Wen Lu; He Xin; Jiang Yue; Fang Xin; Wang Yuqing	Kazakhstan; Aizhan Raushanova; Madina Tursynova; Pernesh Ashimova; Malika Aldabergenova; Azhar Khamimuldinova; Bulbul Kartanbayeva; Alena Fux; Aray Shegebayeva; Zarina Tukhtiyeva; Meruyert Ryspek; Tatyana Likhaus; Anastassiya Orlova; Galiya Nurgaliyeva; Olga Konysheva; Alexandra Feklistova; Karina Felzink; Darya Dmitriyeva; Viktoriya Sazonova; Aida Olzhabayeva; Tatyana Koroleva; Arina Chshyokolova

== Medal table ==
Rank	Nation	Gold	Silver	Bronze	Total
1	Japan (JPN)	1	0	1	2
1	Kazakhstan (KAZ)	1	0	1	2
3	China (CHN)	0	1	0	1
3	South Korea (KOR)	0	1	0	1
Totals (4 entries)		2	2	2	6

== Draw ==
The top division was consisted of four teams.

- Kazakhstan
- Japan
- South Korea
- China

The next six teams registered for the first division based on IIHF World Ranking and 2016 IIHF Challenge Cup of Asia.

- Hong Kong
- United Arab Emirates
- Chinese Taipei
- Mongolia
- Thailand
- Singapore

The remaining teams participated at the second division.

Group A

- Kyrgyzstan
- Qatar
- ~~Bahrain~~*
- Independent Olympic Athletes
- Philippines

Group B

- Malaysia
- Macau
- Indonesia
- ~~Iran~~*
- Turkmenistan

* Bahrain withdrew, Iran did not participate in the tournament due to lack of eligible players.

== Final standing ==
=== Men ===
Rank	Team	Pld	W	OW	OL	L
1st place, gold medalist(s)	Kazakhstan	3	3	0	0	0
2nd place, silver medalist(s)	South Korea	3	2	0	0	1
3rd place, bronze medalist(s)	Japan	3	1	0	0	2
4	China	3	0	0	0	3
5	Thailand	5	4	1	0	0
6	Chinese Taipei	5	3	1	1	0
7	United Arab Emirates	5	3	0	0	2
8	Mongolia	5	2	0	0	3
9	Hong Kong	5	1	0	1	3
10	Singapore	5	0	0	0	5
11	Turkmenistan	4	4	0	0	0
12	Kyrgyzstan	4	3	0	0	1
13	Philippines	4	3	0	0	1
14	Macau	4	2	0	0	2
15	Malaysia	3	1	0	0	2
16	Independent Olympic Athletes	3	1	0	0	2
17	Qatar	3	0	0	0	3
18	Indonesia	3	0	0	0	3

=== Women ===
Rank	Team	Pld	W	OW	OL	L
1st place, gold medalist(s)	Japan	5	5	0	0	0
2nd place, silver medalist(s)	China	5	3	0	1	1
3rd place, bronze medalist(s)	Kazakhstan	5	3	0	0	2
4	South Korea	5	2	1	0	2
5	Thailand	5	1	0	0	4
6	Hong Kong	5	0	0	0	5
