= Ice hockey at the 2017 Asian Winter Games – Men's tournament =

Men at the 2017 Asian Winter Games
- Venue: Mikaho Gymnasium; Hoshioki Skating Rink; Tsukisamu Gymnasium
- Dates: 18–26 February 2017
- Competitors: 391 from 18 nations

Medalists
gold medal	Kazakhstan
silver medal	South Korea
bronze medal	Japan

The men's Ice hockey tournament at the 2017 Asian Winter Games was held in Sapporo, Japan between 18 and 26 February at three venues (Tsukisamu Gymnasium, Mikaho Gymnasium and the Hoshioki Skating Rink).

A total of 18 men's teams competed in three divisions (four in Top Division, six in Division I and eight in Division II), with only the top division being eligible for the medals. Originally 20 teams were scheduled to compete, however Bahrain later withdrew. Iran was also scheduled to compete, however after arriving, more than half the team was deemed ineligible to represent the country due to eligibility issues. Thus the team was disqualified. However the country still played its matches as friendlies, but they did not count towards the standings.

The Kuwait Olympic Committee was suspended in October 2015, due to political interference. Therefore, the country competed under the Olympic flag as Independent Olympic Athletes.

According to the IIHF World Ranking, Kazakhstan were the highest rated team in men's ice hockey, followed by Japan, South Korea, China, Hong Kong and the United Arab Emirates. All other nations were unranked.

== Squads ==
China	Chinese Taipei	Hong Kong	Independent Olympic Athletes
Xia Shengrong; Liu Yongshen; Liang Wenbin; Cui Xijun; Xia Tianxiang; Chen Ling; Hu Tianyu; Zhang Zesen; Na Yungang; Liu Wei; Li Hang; Wang Chongwei; Zhang Hao; Zhang Jiaqi; Liu Qing; Li Zhengyu; Li Tianhao; Wang Chuxiong; Sun Zehao; Zhang Cheng; Yang Mingxi; Zhang Wenqinghuai; Zhu Ziyang	Ting Pang-keng; Shen Yen-lin; Tang Yi-cheng; Huang Jen-hung; Yang Hsiao-hao; Shen Yen-chin; Yang Chang-lin; Lin Tzu-chieh; Chao Yu-tung; Chang Kai-hsiang; Chiu Yi-wei; Chen Jui-tang; Chang Hsing-han; Yang Chang-hsing; Chang Tse-wei; Weng To; Lin Hung-ju; Huang Sheng-chun; Chang Wei-ting; Liao Yu-cheng	King Ho; Tony Leung; To Hei Yu; Herman Lui; Alvin Sham; Lam Chi Kin; Terence Chim; Yannick Wong; John Fu; Howard Yuen; Wong Ka Ho; Kan Siu Him; Julian Ma; Terry Choi; Yeung Chun Ying; Theophilus Wong; Lau Chi Lok; Bernard Fung; Justin Cheng; Emerson Keung; Linus Lo; Jasper Tang; Cheung Ching Ho	Mohammad Al-Maragi; Yousef Al-Andekali; Fahad Al-Henaidi; Bashar Mohammad; Abdullah Al-Maragi; Mohammad Al-Ajmi; Jasem Al-Awadhi; Hamad Al-Shayji; Ahmad Al-Ajmi; Hussain Baqer; Yousef Al-Kandari; Meshal Al-Foudari; Meshal Al-Ajmi; Abdullah Al-Asousi; Jasem Dashti; Saleh Al-Maghrabi; Hamad Al-Ajmi; Abdullah Al-Zidan; Abdulaziz Shetail; Abdulaziz Al-Maragi; Dhari Al-Omran; Jasem Al-Sarraf; Salem Al-Ajmi
Indonesia	Japan	Kazakhstan	Kyrgyzstan
Susanto; Rinaldo Sugara Sutjipto; Felix Aditya Utama; Aditya Rama Landreth; Felix Cahyono; Stefanus Michael Suryadi; Jonathan Sudharta; Stephanus Lukman Sugianto; Abraham Novendra; Sangga Munggaran Putra; Ronald Chandra; Victor Budiwarman; Zaharul Haq; Ready Wongso; Roy Nugraha Tanimulya; Andianto Hie; Muchammad Athalaa Azqa; Jusuf Hendrata; Anryan Saputra; Felix Haristian Yussanto; Ronald Wijaya; Syailendra Bakrie; Yaser Muhammad	Takuto Onoda; Mei Ushu; Keigo Minoshima; Ryo Hashiba; Ryo Hashimoto; Seiji Takahashi; Kenta Takagi; Takuma Kawai; Masahito Nishiwaki; Hiroto Sato; Hiromichi Terao; Go Tanaka; Kohei Mitamura; Makuru Furuhashi; Takafumi Yamashita; Shuhei Kuji; Yuri Terao; Yosuke Haga; Yushiro Hirano; Hiroki Ueno; Takuro Yamashita; Yutaka Fukufuji; Yuto Ito	Anton Kazantsev; Georgiy Dulnev; Madiyar Ibraibekov; Alexandr Kurshuk; Artemiy Lakiza; Kirill Savitskiy; Anton Sagadeyev; Nikita Mikhailis; Ilya Kovzalov; Alexey Antsiferov; Stanislav Zinchenko; Yaroslav Yevdokimov; Alikhan Assetov; Konstantin Savenkov; Ilgiz Nuriyev; Sergey Kudryavtsev; Nursultan Belgibayev; Ivan Stepanenko; Anton Petrov; Maxim Volkov; Dmitriy Grents; Vitaliy Kolesnik	Elzar Bolotbekov; Oleg Kolodii; Amanbek Esen Uulu; Atai Ismaiilov; Adilet Zhookaev; Zalkarbek Salmorbek Uulu; Artem Semiletko; Duulat Abyshev; Urmat Sheishenaliev; Beknazar Paizov; Kanat Abylmechin Uulu; Salamat Tynaliev; Rinat Mustafaev; Vladimir Nichipurenko; Uran Tursunbekov; Daniil Shushenkov; Aibek Shakirov; Adilet Zhyrgalbek Uulu; Nurzhan Ibraimov; Taalaibek Suiunbaev; Adis Kachkynbekov; Adilet Kazybek Uulu; Anton Kudashev
Macau	Malaysia	Mongolia	Philippines
Chu Te Lin; Katsuyoshi Shinoda; Un Kin Fai; Jonay Leung; Ho Chon Nin; Leong Chon Kong; Chon Ka Miu; Iun Chi Fong; Pong Ka Kit; Lei Meng Chi; Mok Kim Kei; U Chi Fong; Kong Chong Man; Tong Chan Wa; Fong Keng Lam; Chan Ka Lok; Guan Chentao; Fong Chou Tek; Chan Chi Kit; Lai Neng; Vong Wai Tong; Tam Weng Leong; Mok Kim Hei	Lee Thien Ian; Stephen Prakash Santhanasamy; Yap Eu Jin; Loke Ban Kin; Darshen Chelliah; Low Jun Ming; Aqfar Naeem Abulais; Syed Ayman Shahabuddin; Taufiq Azman; Yow Cheong Jun; Hafis Anjam; Khoo Seng Chee; Brandon Tan; Shahrul Ilyas; Aiman Zul Rafiq; Tengku Azlly; Aqeel Noor Hisham; Hariz Oryza; Moi Jia Yung; Reezman Isa; Bryan Lim; Syukri Shaharudin	Bazarvaany Baatarkhüü; Bayarsaikhany Mönkhbold; Zorigtyn Batgerel; Ideriin Gerelt; Ichinnorovyn Altangerel; Boldyn Erdenesükh; Tsogtoogiin Shinebayar; Bayajikhyn Boldbayar; Pürevdorjiin Batzayaa; Erdenetogtokhyn Enkhsükh; Jargalsaikhany Bayarsaikhan; Tsendbaataryn Och; Dorjsürengiin Zolboo; Namjilyn Mishigsüren; Mönkhbayaryn Batbold; Ganboldyn Tamir; Baatarkhüügiin Tserenbaljir; Boldbaataryn Mönkhüü	Lenard Lancero; Jed Reyes; Allison Lapiz; Carl Montano; Patrick Syquiatco; Philip Cheng; Jose Cadiz; Javier Cadiz; Carlo Garrucho; Steven Füglister; Jon Samson; Francois Gautier; Paolo Spafford; Gianpietro Iseppi; Miguel Relampagos; Julian Santiago; Julius Santiago; Paul Sanchez; Miguel Serrano; Georgino Orda; Hector Navasero; Michael Wang; Benjamin Imperial
Qatar	Singapore	South Korea	Thailand
Mohamed Abdelaziz; Jassim Fakhroo; Mohammed Al-Khalaf; Thamer Al-Mohannadi; Saad Al-Moslamani; Ali Al-Muhaizaa; Abdulrahman Al-Ashqar; Saoud Al-Kuwari; Eid Al-Kubaisi; Ahmad Al-Sulaiti; Turki Al-Heidous; Abdulla Al-Muhaizaa; Abdulla Mohammed; Jassim Al-Sheeb; Ahmad Fakhroo; Abdulla Al-Sulaiti; Abdulaziz Fakhroo; Mohammed Al-Muhaizaa; Mohamed Al-Kaabi; Naif Al-Rumaihi	Peter Tan; Joewe Lam; Loh Chee Seng; Lam Kin Yu; Eugene Chin; Liu Zhiyang; Richard O'Brien; Kenny Liang; Gabriel Lau; Samuel Lim; Ryan Tan; Chen Pei Huan; Chew Wee; Chiong Woon Lip; Ang Yu Jin; Siah Ming Zhe; Benjamin Huang; Joshua Lee	Matt Dalton; Seo Yeong-jun; Bryan Young; Kim Won-jun; Kim Yoon-hwan; Cho Min-ho; Michael Swift; Kim Ki-sung; Oh Hyon-ho; Jeon Jung-woo; Shin Sang-woo; Lee Don-ku; Shin Sang-hoon; Kim Won-jung; Kim Sang-wook; Lee Chong-hyun; Park Jin-kyu; Mike Testwuide; Eric Regan; Park Woo-sang; Shin Hyung-yun; Park Kye-hoon; Park Sung-je	Rakchai Sukwiboon; Tewin Chartsuwan; Panithi Nawasmittawong; Weerachai Prasertsri; Teerasak Rattanachot; Nattapong Harnnarujchai; Prawes Kaewjeen; Anun Kullugin; Chanchit Supadilokluk; Jantaphong Tengsakul; Kim Aarola; Prakpoom Thongaram; Andreas Helgesen; Pattarapol Ungkulpattanasuk; Ken Kindborn; Papan Thanakroekkiat; Chanchieo Supadilokluk; Rattharut Surasirirattanasin; Likit Neimwan; Peravit Kovitaya; Masato Kitayama; Vorravith Maklamthong
Turkmenistan	United Arab Emirates		
Rahman Muratow; Kerim Baýramow; Ilýas Weliýew; Nikita Selifonkin; Ewald Gaýer; Pawel Barkowskiý; Nurmämmet Nuryýew; Amangeldi Aganyýazow; Ezizmuhammet Akmuhammedow; Döwlet Hydyrow; Döwlet Söýünow; Baýmyrat Baýmyradow; Meýlis Kulyýew; Dmitriý Sawin; Işan Weliýew; Aleksandr Wahowskiý; Keremli Çaryýew; Şyhy Babaýew; Ýakut Berdiýew; Ahmet Gurbanow; Mämmet Myradow; Maksat Ataýew	Khaled Al-Suwaidi; Suhail Al-Mheiri; Ebraheem Budebs; Theyab Al-Subousi; Ali Al-Haddad; Mohammed Al-Dhaheri; Juma Al-Dhaheri; Salem Al-Yafei; Omar Al-Shamsi; Ali Al-Mazrouei; Faisal Al-Baloushi; Khalifa Al-Mahrooqi; Mohamed Al-Kaabi; Mohammed Al-Shamsi; Obaid Al-Muharami; Saeed Al-Nuaimi; Aeyez Al-Muhairbe; Ahmed Al-Dhaheri; Faisal Al-Suwaidi; Saif Al-Ameri		

== Results ==
All times are Japan Standard Time (UTC+09:00)

=== Division II ===
==== Preliminary round ====
===== Group A =====
Pos	Team	Pld	W	OW	OL	L	GF	GA	GD	Pts	Qualification
1	Kyrgyzstan	3	3	0	0	0	22	7	+15	9	Division II – Final
2	Philippines	3	2	0	0	1	27	15	+12	6	Division II – 3rd place
3	Independent Olympic Athletes	3	1	0	0	2	9	15	−6	3	
4	Qatar	3	0	0	0	3	6	27	−21	0	

Source: IIHF

18 February; 20:00	Independent Olympic Athletes	0–5 (0–1, 0–3, 0–1)	Kyrgyzstan	Hoshioki Skating Rink, Sapporo; Attendance: 104

Game reference

Jasem Al-Sarraf
Goalies
Rinat Mustafaev
Referee:
Lee Joo-hyun (KOR)

0–1	10:30 – Shushenkov (Kolodii)
0–2	22:39 – Kolodii (Semiletko) (PP)
0–3	23:28 – Kudashev (Nichipurenko)
0–4	32:00 – Kolodii (PP)
0–5	57:43 – Semiletko (Shushenkov, Kolodii)

60 min
Penalties
71 min
19
Shots
48

21 February; 16:30	Qatar	2–6 (0–1, 0–2, 2–3)	Independent Olympic Athletes	Hoshioki Skating Rink, Sapporo; Attendance: 62

Game reference

Ahmad Al-Sulaiti
Goalies
Jasem Al-Sarraf
Jasem Dashti
Referee:
Lim Yong Chun (MAS)

	0–1	13:07 – Al-Awadhi (Al-Asousi)
	0–2	26:36 – Al-Kandari (Mohammad)
	0–3	36:55 – Abdull. Al-Maragi (Al-Awadhi, Mo. Al-Ajmi) (SH)
	0–4	41:13 – Abdull. Al-Maragi (A. Al-Ajmi)
Al. Al-Muhaizaa – 45:03	1–4
	1–5	50:07 – Abdull. Al-Maragi (Shetail) (PP)
	1–6	52:58 – Al-Awadhi
Ab. Al-Muhaizaa – 54:17	2–6

4 min
Penalties
16 min
16
Shots
33

21 February; 20:00	Kyrgyzstan	10–5 (6–1, 1–3, 3–1)	Philippines	Hoshioki Skating Rink, Sapporo; Attendance: 86

Game reference

Rinat Mustafaev
Goalies
Paolo Spafford
Gianpietro Iseppi
Referee:
Krzysztof Kozłowski (POL)

Kudashev (Nichipurenko) – 00:13	1–0
Kudashev (Nichipurenko, Kolodii) (PP2) – 02:19	2–0
Kolodii (Kudashev) – 06:10	3–0
Kolodii (Kudashev) – 09:26	4–0
Kolodii (PP2) – 13:32	5–0
	5–1	15:05 – Imperial (Füglister, Juliu. Santiago)
Kudashev (Semiletko) (PP) – 19:50	6–1
	6–2	30:24 – Sanchez
Tynaliev (Abylmechin Uulu, Sheishenaliev) – 30:43	7–2
	7–3	31:39 – Füglister (Montano) (SH)
	7–4	33:24 – Sanchez (Lancero)
	7–5	46:12 – Montano (Jo. Cadiz) (PP)
Shushenkov (Kolodii) – 50:29	8–5
Nichipurenko (Kolodii) – 56:54	9–5
Kolodii (Nichipurenko, Kudashev) – 59:34	10–5

20 min
Penalties
28 min
39
Shots
27

23 February; 20:00	Qatar	2–14 (1–4, 0–5, 1–5)	Philippines	Hoshioki Skating Rink, Sapporo; Attendance: 103

Game reference

Ahmad Al-Sulaiti
Mohamed Abdelaziz
Goalies
Gianpietro Iseppi
Referee:
Hideki Yamauchi (JPN)

	0–1	06:36 – Sanchez (Montano)
	0–2	12:22 – Gautier (Sanchez, Lancero) (PP)
Mohammed (Ah. Fakhroo) – 13:24	1–2
	1–3	18:01 – Imperial (Füglister) (PP)
	1–4	19:54 – Montano (Füglister)
	1–5	21:03 – Relampagos (Sanchez)
	1–6	23:17 – Füglister
	1–7	24:14 – Sanchez (Jo. Cadiz, Montano)
	1–8	29:13 – Imperial (Montano) (PP)
	1–9	31:36 – Syquiatco (Sanchez) (PP)
	1–10	41:00 – Lancero (Sanchez)
	1–11	43:46 – Montano (Jo. Cadiz, Füglister)
	1–12	46:49 – Lancero (Jo. Cadiz)
	1–13	52:43 – Lancero (Sanchez, Relampagos)
Mohammed (Al-Mohannadi, Ah. Fakhroo) – 53:51	2–13
	2–14	54:10 – Füglister

39 min
Penalties
10 min
32
Shots
50

24 February; 16:30	Kyrgyzstan	7–2 (2–0, 4–0, 1–2)	Qatar	Hoshioki Skating Rink, Sapporo; Attendance: 68

Game reference

Elzar Bolotbekov
Goalies
Ahmad Al-Sulaiti
Referee:
Krzysztof Kozłowski (POL)

Kolodii (Nichipurenko, Kudashev) – 08:35	1–0
Kolodii (Esen Uulu) – 18:21	2–0
Ibraimov (Kolodii, Nichipurenko) – 20:31	3–0
Nichipurenko (Kolodii) (PP) – 22:22	4–0
Kudashev (Semiletko) – 24:40	5–0
Semiletko (Kudashev, Ibraimov) – 35:44	6–0
	6–1	48:03 – Al. Al-Muhaizaa (Al-Mohannadi, Ab. Al-Muhaizaa) (PP)
Tursunbekov (Abyshev) – 54:46	7–1
	7–2	57:45 – Al-Rumaihi (Ab. Al-Muhaizaa) (PP2)

26 min
Penalties
14 min
55
Shots
24

24 February; 20:00	Philippines	8–3 (2–2, 4–0, 2–1)	Independent Olympic Athletes	Hoshioki Skating Rink, Sapporo; Attendance: 127

Game reference

Paolo Spafford
Goalies
Jasem Al-Sarraf
Referee:
Kimmo Hokkanen (JPN)

Relampagos (Sanchez, Lancero) – 01:06	1–0
	1–1	11:06 – Al-Awadhi (Al-Zidan)
Sanchez (Relampagos, Ja. Cadiz) – 13:42	2–1
	2–2	18:09 – Al-Awadhi
Montano (Füglister) – 26:28	3–2
Montano (PS) – 29:31	4–2
Montano (Juliu. Santiago) – 34:20	5–2
Relampagos (Sanchez) (PP) – 36:59	6–2
	6–3	55:22 – Al-Awadhi (Al-Zidan) (SH)
Sanchez (PP) – 55:41	7–3
Lancero (Sanchez) – 58:06	8–3

76 min
Penalties
86 min
38
Shots
41

===== Group B =====
Pos	Team	Pld	W	OW	OL	L	GF	GA	GD	Pts	Qualification
1	Turkmenistan	3	3	0	0	0	37	4	+33	9	Division II – Final
2	Macau	3	2	0	0	1	15	22	−7	6	Division II – 3rd place
3	Malaysia	3	1	0	0	2	19	20	−1	3	
4	Indonesia	3	0	0	0	3	6	31	−25	0	

Source: IIHF

18 February; 13:00	Turkmenistan	9–2 (5–0, 4–1, 0–1)	Malaysia	Hoshioki Skating Rink, Sapporo; Attendance: 113

Game reference

Keremli Çaryýew
Goalies
Lee Thien Ian
Referee:
Richard Magnusson (SWE)

Wahowskiý (Gurbanow) – 01:05	1–0
Wahowskiý (Gurbanow) – 12:05	2–0
Iş. Weliýew – 15:33	3–0
Berdiýew (Ataýew) – 15:40	4–0
Akmuhammedow (Wahowskiý, Gurbanow) – 19:48	5–0
Berdiýew (Kulyýew) – 27:47	6–0
	6–1	29:45 – Loke (Oryza, Yap) (PP)
Ataýew (Berdiýew, Kulyýew) – 30:52	7–1
Iş. Weliýew (Söýünow) – 33:15	8–1
Söýünow – 39:13	9–1
	9–2	44:51 – Loke (Moi)

8 min
Penalties
4 min
50
Shots
14

21 February; 9:30	Macau	0–16 (0–6, 0–4, 0–6)	Turkmenistan	Hoshioki Skating Rink, Sapporo; Attendance: 155

Game reference

Chu Te Lin
Goalies
Keremli Çaryýew
Rahman Muratow
Referee:
Hideki Yamauchi (JPN)

0–1	02:05 – Kulyýew
0–2	04:27 – Iş. Weliýew (Söýünow)
0–3	08:42 – Akmuhammedow (Wahowskiý, Gurbanow) (PP)
0–4	10:52 – Gurbanow (Wahowskiý)
0–5	13:48 – Barkowskiý (Söýünow)
0–6	15:28 – Wahowskiý (Gurbanow)
0–7	31:55 – Akmuhammedow (Gurbanow)
0–8	33:20 – Sawin (Söýünow)
0–9	34:08 – Ataýew (Kulyýew, Berdiýew)
0–10	39:25 – Baýmyradow (Myradow)
0–11	48:02 – Baýmyradow (PP)
0–12	48:30 – Akmuhammedow (Wahowskiý, Gurbanow)
0–13	50:47 – Baýmyradow (Ataýew) (PP)
0–14	52:24 – Gurbanow (Aganyýazow) (SH)
0–15	55:35 – Baýmyradow
0–16	59:16 – Nuryýew

14 min
Penalties
6 min
8
Shots
66

21 February; 13:00	Malaysia	13–2 (6–1, 3–1, 4–0)	Indonesia	Hoshioki Skating Rink, Sapporo; Attendance: 146

Game reference

Lee Thien Ian
Goalies
Susanto
Sangga Munggaran Putra
Referee:
Lee Joo-hyun (KOR)

Tan (Loke) (PP) – 04:30	1–0
Lim (Loke, Rafiq) – 06:53	2–0
Loke (Lim, Oryza) (PP) – 11:49	3–0
	3–1	13:24 – Hie (Azqa) (PP)
Loke – 13:32	4–1
Anjam (Loke) – 13:51	5–1
Oryza (Low) – 15:01	6–1
Yow (Shahabuddin, Chelliah) – 22:08	7–1
Lim (Loke, Anjam) – 23:24	8–1
	8–2	25:22 – Suryadi
Oryza (Loke, Tan) (PP2) – 27:50	9–2
Lim (Oryza, Rafiq) – 44:34	10–2
Anjam (Low, Abulais) – 46:32	11–2
Tan (Loke) – 48:09	12–2
Abulais (Anjam) – 49:28	13–2

47 min
Penalties
26 min
40
Shots
12

23 February; 13:00	Macau	6–2 (2–0, 4–0, 0–2)	Indonesia	Hoshioki Skating Rink, Sapporo; Attendance: 87

Game reference

Chu Te Lin
Vong Wai Tong
Goalies
Susanto
Sangga Munggaran Putra
Referee:
Richard Magnusson (SWE)

Leung (Kong) (PP) – 05:17	1–0
Leung (Chon) – 08:39	2–0
Kong (Mok K.H.) – 27:15	3–0
Mok K.H. (Mok K.K.) – 28:31	4–0
Fong C. (Pong, Chon) (PP) – 32:12	5–0
Lei (Mok K.H.) – 37:13	6–0
	6–1	55:36 – Tanimulya (Hie)
	6–2	59:36 – Chandra (Wijaya) (SH)

22 min
Penalties
14 min
42
Shots
25

24 February; 9:30	Malaysia	4–9 (1–2, 1–4, 2–3)	Macau	Hoshioki Skating Rink, Sapporo; Attendance: 110

Game reference

Lee Thien Ian
Goalies
Chu Te Lin
Referee:
Hideki Yamauchi (JPN)

	0–1	04:07 – Fong C. (Kong) (PP)
	0–2	06:23 – Mok K.H. (Ho, Kong) (PP)
Loke (Yap) (PP) – 18:19	1–2
	1–3	20:44 – Mok K.H.
	1–4	22:53 – Mok K.K. (Kong) (PP)
	1–5	25:39 – Mok K.K. (Ho) (SH)
	1–6	31:46 – Ho (Chan K.)
Loke (Lim) – 38:42	2–6
	2–7	41:55 – Fong C. (Mok K.K.)
Lim (Loke) (PP) – 43:45	3–7
Loke (Tan) – 51:11	4–7
	4–8	57:01 – Pong
	4–9	57:46 – Leung

50 min
Penalties
16 min
40
Shots
24

24 February; 13:00	Indonesia	2–12 (1–5, 0–5, 1–2)	Turkmenistan	Hoshioki Skating Rink, Sapporo; Attendance: 102

Game reference

Sangga Munggaran Putra
Goalies
Keremli Çaryýew
Rahman Muratow
Referee:
Lim Yong Chun (MAS)

	0–1	01:20 – Söýünow (Barkowskiý)
	0–2	03:39 – Gaýer (Nuryýew, Söýünow)
	0–3	06:04 – Söýünow (Barkowskiý)
Novendra (Saputra) – 12:44	1–3
	1–4	16:12 – Barkowskiý
	1–5	17:13 – Sawin (Myradow)
	1–6	25:21 – Baýmyradow (Sawin, Myradow)
	1–7	33:24 – Hydyrow (Aganyýazow, Gurbanow)
	1–8	37:14 – Gurbanow (Akmuhammedow)
	1–9	38:32 – Söýünow
	1–10	38:54 – Kulyýew
	1–11	48:16 – Kulyýew (Berdiýew) (SH)
Cahyono (Wijaya) – 51:27	2–11
	2–12	59:59 – Gaýer (Baýmyradow)

2 min
Penalties
8 min
11
Shots
71

==== Final round ====
===== 3rd place =====
26 February; 9:00	Philippines	9–2 (5–0, 2–1, 2–1)	Macau	Hoshioki Skating Rink, Sapporo; Attendance: 208

Game reference

Gianpietro Iseppi
Goalies
Chu Te Lin
Referee:
Hideki Yamauchi (JPN)

Montano (Füglister) – 01:46	1–0
Relampagos (Lancero) – 06:53	2–0
Sanchez (Relampagos) – 12:31	3–0
Relampagos (Sanchez) (PP) – 14:13	4–0
Sanchez – 17:16	5–0
Füglister – 28:03	6–0
Füglister (Montano, Juliu. Santiago) – 31:38	7–0
	7–1	34:20 – Leung
Sanchez (Gautier) (PP) – 47:45	8–1
	8–2	51:55 – Kong (Leung)
Relampagos (Lancero) – 56:31	9–2

6 min
Penalties
4 min
42
Shots
25

===== Final =====
26 February; 12:30	Kyrgyzstan	3–7 (2–2, 0–1, 1–4)	Turkmenistan	Hoshioki Skating Rink, Sapporo; Attendance: 243

Game reference

Rinat Mustafaev
Goalies
Keremli Çaryýew
Referee:
Krzysztof Kozłowski (POL)

	0–1	05:04 – Gurbanow (PP)
	0–2	06:11 – Ataýew (Berdiýew)
Kolodii (Nichipurenko) (PP) – 15:14	1–2
Nichipurenko (Semiletko) – 19:22	2–2
	2–3	34:14 – Barkowskiý (Gaýer) (PP)
	2–4	44:10 – Söýünow (Iş. Weliýew)
	2–5	50:58 – Akmuhammedow (Wahowskiý, Gurbanow) (PP)
Nichipurenko (PP) – 53:00	3–5
	3–6	54:13 – Kulyýew (Ataýew)
	3–7	56:05 – Sawin (Barkowskiý, Söýünow)

46 min
Penalties
18 min
26
Shots
64

=== Division I ===
Pos	Team	Pld	W	OW	OL	L	GF	GA	GD	Pts
1	Thailand	5	4	1	0	0	36	12	+24	14
2	Chinese Taipei	5	3	1	1	0	34	13	+21	12
3	United Arab Emirates	5	3	0	0	2	29	24	+5	9
4	Mongolia	5	2	0	0	3	25	23	+2	6
5	Hong Kong	5	1	0	1	3	27	27	0	4
6	Singapore	5	0	0	0	5	4	56	−52	0

Source: IIHF

18 February; 12:00	Singapore	1–12 (0–2, 1–5, 0–5)	Hong Kong	Mikaho Gymnasium, Sapporo; Attendance: 260

Game reference

Eugene Chin
Kenny Liang
Goalies
King Ho
Emerson Keung
Referee:
Benjamin Hoppe (GER)

	0–1	03:03 – Cheng (Tang)
	0–2	14:43 – Kan (Fung, Leung)
	0–3	25:27 – Wong K. (PP)
	0–4	27:40 – Lui (Cheng, Leung)
	0–5	31:51 – Fung (Sham, Kan)
	0–6	37:51 – Yuen
Lam K. (Lau) – 38:37	1–6
	1–7	39:36 – Lo (Lau, Yeung)
	1–8	44:52 – Cheng (Tang)
	1–9	46:37 – Y. Wong (Kan)
	1–10	50:34 – Yuen (Cheng, Lui) (PP)
	1–11	56:18 – Cheng (Lui)
	1–12	59:43 – Cheng

12 min
Penalties
4 min
16
Shots
45

18 February; 15:30	Chinese Taipei	10–3 (4–1, 1–1, 5–1)	United Arab Emirates	Mikaho Gymnasium, Sapporo; Attendance: 290

Game reference

Ting Pang-keng
Goalies
Khaled Al-Suwaidi
Ahmed Al-Dhaheri
Referee:
Kimmo Hokkanen (JPN)

Yang C.L. (Chang K.) – 08:12	1–0
Lin T. (Chiu, Yang H.) – 09:57	2–0
Yang C.H. (Chang W.) – 15:11	3–0
Chang W. (Yang C.L., Chang K.) (PP) – 18:09	4–0
	4–1	18:59 – M. Al-Dhaheri (Al-Nuaimi) (PP2)
	4–2	29:11 – Al-Nuaimi
Chang K. (Yang C.L., Yang C.H.) – 31:56	5–2
Chao (Shen Y.C., Lin H.) – 41:59	6–2
	6–3	46:22 – M. Al-Shamsi (Al-Mahrooqi) (PP)
Yang C.H. (Chiu) – 48:53	7–3
Chao (Shen Y.C., Lin H.) – 50:54	8–3
Yang C.L. (Chang K., Yang C.H.) – 54:01	9–3
Yang C.H. (Chen) – 59:59	10–3

12 min
Penalties
22 min
44
Shots
20

18 February; 19:00	Thailand	5–4 (1–1, 3–1, 1–2)	Mongolia	Mikaho Gymnasium, Sapporo; Attendance: 200

Game reference

Pattarapol Ungkulpattanasuk
Goalies
Bayarsaikhany Mönkhbold
Bazarvaany Baatarkhüü
Referee:
Chang Sung-kuk (KOR)

Aarola (Kindborn) – 05:09	1–0
	1–1	12:17 – Batgerel (Tamir) (PP)
Kindborn (Kovitaya, Rattanachot) (PP) – 25:01	2–1
Kitayama (Tengsakul, Neimwan) (PP) – 28:28	3–1
Aarola (Chartsuwan, Chanchit Supadilokluk) – 32:11	4–1
	4–2	32:19 – Zolboo (Batbold)
	4–3	44:23 – Gerelt (Batgerel, Tamir) (PP)
	4–4	51:24 – Erdenesükh (Shinebayar, Tamir)
Rattanachot (Kindborn, Aarola) (PP) – 52:51	5–4

14 min
Penalties
18 min
43
Shots
27

20 February; 12:00	United Arab Emirates	4–6 (0–1, 1–2, 3–3)	Thailand	Mikaho Gymnasium, Sapporo; Attendance: 450

Game reference

Ahmed Al-Dhaheri
Goalies
Prawes Kaewjeen
Referee:
Benjamin Hoppe (GER)

	0–1	00:49 – Neimwan (Kitayama)
	0–2	22:00 – Neimwan (Aarola, Chartsuwan) (PP)
Al-Subousi (Al-Ameri, J. Al-Dhaheri) – 30:31	1–2
	1–3	38:22 – Tengsakul (Neimwan)
	1–4	42:38 – Kitayama (Chanchit Supadilokluk, Nawasmittawong)
Al-Nuaimi (Al-Mahrooqi) – 43:39	2–4
	2–5	48:48 – Chartsuwan (Kindborn) (PP2)
J. Al-Dhaheri (SH2) – 49:57	3–5
Al-Mheiri (Al-Kaabi, O. Al-Shamsi) – 55:05	4–5
	4–6	59:31 – Chartsuwan (EN)

24 min
Penalties
6 min
19
Shots
52

20 February; 15:30	Mongolia	8–0 (2–0, 4–0, 2–0)	Singapore	Mikaho Gymnasium, Sapporo; Attendance: 240

Game reference

Bayarsaikhany Mönkhbold
Bazarvaany Baatarkhüü
Goalies
Eugene Chin
Referee:
Kimmo Hokkanen (JPN)

Boldbayar (Bayarsaikhan, Zolboo) (PP) – 18:38	1–0
Bayarsaikhan (Tserenbaljir, Batgerel) (PP2) – 19:54	2–0
Gerelt (Tserenbaljir, Altangerel) – 24:36	3–0
Batzayaa (Erdenesükh, Shinebayar) (PP) – 30:18	4–0
Batgerel (Gerelt, Altangerel) – 38:05	5–0
Gerelt (Tamir) – 39:00	6–0
Batzayaa (Tamir, Bayarsaikhan) (SH) – 42:51	7–0
Boldbayar (Batgerel) (PP) – 58:56	8–0

14 min
Penalties
66 min
41
Shots
10

20 February; 19:00	Hong Kong	4–5 GWS (3–0, 0–3, 1–1) (OT: 0–0) (SO: 0–1)	Chinese Taipei	Mikaho Gymnasium, Sapporo; Attendance: 180

Game reference

King Ho
Goalies
Ting Pang-keng
Referee:
Peter Stano (SVK)

Tang (Yuen, Cheng) (PP) – 05:40	1–0
Tang (Cheng) – 10:14	2–0
Cheng (Y. Wong) – 11:53	3–0
	3–1	29:26 – Shen Y.C. (Chao, Weng) (PP)
	3–2	32:07 – Weng (Chao)
	3–3	36:18 – Shen Y.C. (Weng, Chao) (PP)
	3–4	56:48 – Shen Y.C. (Lin H.) (PP)
Lui – 59:23	4–4

Yuen (miss)
Cheng (miss)
Sham (miss)
Shootout
(miss) Chang K.
Weng
28 min
Penalties
14 min
19
Shots
39

21 February; 12:00	Singapore	1–11 (1–3, 0–5, 0–3)	Chinese Taipei	Mikaho Gymnasium, Sapporo; Attendance: 200

Game reference

Eugene Chin
Kenny Liang
Goalies
Liao Yu-cheng
Referee:
Chang Sung-kuk (KOR)

	0–1	03:12 – Lin H. (Shen Y.C.)
	0–2	05:01 – Yang C.H. (Chen, Chang K.)
	0–3	11:03 – Shen Y.L. (Chang K., Chen) (PP)
Chen (Ang, Lam K.) (PP2) – 17:13	1–3
	1–4	24:00 – Lin H. (Chang T., Chao) (SH)
	1–5	25:46 – Chiu (Lin T., Yang H.)
	1–6	26:13 – Shen Y.C. (Shen Y.L., Lin H.)
	1–7	27:05 – Chao
	1–8	30:00 – Lin T. (Yang H., Chang H.)
	1–9	43:16 – Lin H. (Chang T.)
	1–10	48:37 – Shen Y.L.
	1–11	50:10 – Chen (Yang H., Chang H.)

6 min
Penalties
14 min
16
Shots
43

21 February; 15:30	Hong Kong	2–8 (1–3, 1–2, 0–3)	Thailand	Mikaho Gymnasium, Sapporo; Attendance: 270

Game reference

Emerson Keung
King Ho
Goalies
Prawes Kaewjeen
Referee:
Kimmo Hokkanen (JPN)

	0–1	03:27 – Aarola (Neimwan)
	0–2	07:00 – Rattanachot (Chartsuwan, Neimwan) (PP)
	0–3	08:48 – Aarola (Neimwan) (SH)
Cheng (Wong K., Tang) (PP) – 19:24	1–3
	1–4	21:27 – Thanakroekkiat (Kitayama)
	1–5	27:27 – Kitayama (Chartsuwan, Kindborn)
Cheng (SH) – 39:51	2–5
	2–6	42:42 – Kindborn
	2–7	49:16 – Aarola (Rattanachot, Kitayama)
	2–8	53:25 – Sukwiboon (Aarola) (PP)

22 min
Penalties
14 min
31
Shots
43

21 February; 19:00	United Arab Emirates	6–3 (3–0, 1–1, 2–2)	Mongolia	Mikaho Gymnasium, Sapporo; Attendance: 200

Game reference

Khaled Al-Suwaidi
Goalies
Bazarvaany Baatarkhüü
Bayarsaikhany Mönkhbold
Referee:
Peter Stano (SVK)

Al-Nuaimi (Al-Mahrooqi, J. Al-Dhaheri) – 03:56	1–0
Al-Kaabi (Al-Mahrooqi) – 18:02	2–0
Al-Mheiri (O. Al-Shamsi) – 19:06	3–0
Al-Kaabi (Al-Mheiri) – 33:37	4–0
	4–1	39:51 – Tserenbaljir
J. Al-Dhaheri (Al-Nuaimi) – 41:02	5–1
Al-Kaabi – 43:53	6–1
	6–2	49:12 – Erdenesükh (Shinebayar) (SH)
	6–3	52:56 – Tamir (Altangerel)

16 min
Penalties
14 min
24
Shots
52

23 February; 12:00	Chinese Taipei	2–3 OT (1–0, 0–0, 1–2) (OT: 0–1)	Thailand	Mikaho Gymnasium, Sapporo; Attendance: 500

Game reference

Ting Pang-keng
Goalies
Prawes Kaewjeen
Referee:
Peter Stano (SVK)

Weng (Shen Y.L.) – 07:03	1–0
Yang C.H. (Chang K.) – 49:05	2–0
	2–1	55:03 – Kindborn (Chartsuwan)
	2–2	59:33 – Neimwan (Chanchie. Supadilokluk)
	2–3	60:49 – Kindborn (Aarola, Kitayama)

6 min
Penalties
6 min
40
Shots
50

23 February; 15:30	Mongolia	8–6 (6–2, 1–2, 1–2)	Hong Kong	Mikaho Gymnasium, Sapporo; Attendance: 280

Game reference

Bayarsaikhany Mönkhbold
Bazarvaany Baatarkhüü
Goalies
King Ho
Emerson Keung
Referee:
Benjamin Hoppe (GER)

Batzayaa (Zolboo, Boldbayar) (PP) – 04:43	1–0
Batzayaa (Bayarsaikhan) (PP) – 05:19	2–0
Tserenbaljir (Gerelt, Boldbayar) (PP) – 06:42	3–0
Batgerel (Bayarsaikhan, Tserenbaljir) – 08:08	4–0
	4–1	09:23 – Kan (Yuen) (PP)
Tserenbaljir (Gerelt) – 15:54	5–1
Shinebayar (Batgerel) – 16:13	6–1
	6–2	19:33 – Sham (Fu, Y. Wong)
	6–3	22:30 – To
	6–4	29:37 – Tang (Lo)
Tamir (Boldbayar, Shinebayar) – 33:13	7–4
	7–5	47:25 – Tang
	7–6	53:35 – Fu
Boldbayar (EN) – 59:46	8–6

8 min
Penalties
36 min
38
Shots
30

23 February; 19:00	United Arab Emirates	11–2 (3–0, 3–1, 5–1)	Singapore	Mikaho Gymnasium, Sapporo; Attendance: 160

Game reference

Ahmed Al-Dhaheri
Goalies
Kenny Liang
Referee:
Krzysztof Kozłowski (POL)

O. Al-Shamsi (Al-Muharami, Al-Haddad) (PP) – 10:40	1–0
J. Al-Dhaheri (Al-Haddad) – 12:52	2–0
Al-Nuaimi (J. Al-Dhaheri) – 19:45	3–0
Al-Mahrooqi – 26:02	4–0
Al-Nuaimi (Al-Mahrooqi) (PP) – 31:01	5–0
Al-Nuaimi (M. Al-Dhaheri, Al-Kaabi) (PP2) – 34:27	6–0
	6–1	36:00 – Lee (R. Tan) (PP)
Al-Mahrooqi (J. Al-Dhaheri) – 40:22	7–1
O. Al-Shamsi (Al-Mheiri, Al-Kaabi) (PP) – 43:46	8–1
Al-Kaabi (J. Al-Dhaheri) (PP) – 46:56	9–1
Al-Nuaimi (M. Al-Dhaheri, Al-Yafei) – 49:40	10–1
Al-Subousi (Al-Muhairbe) – 56:00	11–1
	11–2	56:42 – Chen

4 min
Penalties
22 min
44
Shots
5

25 February; 12:00	Mongolia	2–6 (0–1, 1–2, 1–3)	Chinese Taipei	Mikaho Gymnasium, Sapporo; Attendance: 500

Game reference

Bayarsaikhany Mönkhbold
Bazarvaany Baatarkhüü
Goalies
Ting Pang-keng
Referee:
Peter Stano (SVK)

	0–1	03:47 – Weng (Chao)
	0–2	27:55 – Yang C.L. (Weng) (PP)
Tserenbaljir (SH) – 29:20	1–2
	1–3	32:46 – Lin H. (Shen Y.C.) (PP)
	1–4	40:09 – Lin H. (Shen Y.L.)
	1–5	43:09 – Shen Y.C. (Chang K.)
Gerelt (Altangerel) – 48:50	2–5
	2–6	55:05 – Weng

14 min
Penalties
14 min
23
Shots
28

25 February; 15:30	Thailand	14–0 (5–0, 5–0, 4–0)	Singapore	Mikaho Gymnasium, Sapporo; Attendance: 250

Game reference

Pattarapol Ungkulpattanasuk
Prakpoom Thongaram
Goalies
Kenny Liang
Referee:
Benjamin Hoppe (GER)

Chartsuwan (Kindborn) – 02:35	1–0
Kindborn (Nawasmittawong) – 04:51	2–0
Kitayama (Chartsuwan) – 10:43	3–0
Aarola (Neimwan) – 11:56	4–0
Aarola (Kindborn) – 19:15	5–0
Kitayama – 21:12	6–0
Aarola (Helgesen) – 23:26	7–0
Neimwan (Kitayama) (SH2) – 34:17	8–0
Harnnarujchai (Tengsakul) – 36:29	9–0
Kindborn (Aarola) – 37:34	10–0
Rattanachot (Aarola) – 42:13	11–0
Neimwan (Tengsakul) – 48:25	12–0
Kindborn (Kitayama) – 49:01	13–0
Aarola (Harnnarujchai) – 54:08	14–0

4 min
Penalties
2 min
50
Shots
13

25 February; 19:00	Hong Kong	3–5 (1–0, 1–2, 1–3)	United Arab Emirates	Mikaho Gymnasium, Sapporo; Attendance: 180

Game reference

King Ho
Goalies
Khaled Al-Suwaidi
Referee:
Chang Sung-kuk (KOR)

Lo (Chim) – 13:33	1–0
	1–1	20:53 – J. Al-Dhaheri (Al-Mahrooqi)
	1–2	25:51 – Al-Muhairbe (Al-Baloushi, Al-Subousi)
Yuen (Lui) – 38:32	2–2
	2–3	40:54 – J. Al-Dhaheri (Al-Mahrooqi) (PP)
Lui (Y. Wong, To) – 42:12	3–3
	3–4	50:40 – Al-Mahrooqi (SH)
	3–5	57:23 – M. Al-Dhaheri (Al-Mahrooqi) (PP)

10 min
Penalties
8 min
30
Shots
25

=== Top division ===
Pos	Team	Pld	W	OW	OL	L	GF	GA	GD	Pts
1	Kazakhstan	3	3	0	0	0	19	0	+19	9
2	South Korea	3	2	0	0	1	14	5	+9	6
3	Japan	3	1	0	0	2	15	11	+4	3
4	China	3	0	0	0	3	0	32	−32	0

Source: IIHF

22 February; 15:30	South Korea	0–4 (0–0, 0–2, 0–2)	Kazakhstan	Tsukisamu Gymnasium, Sapporo; Attendance: 513

Game reference

Matt Dalton
Goalies
Vitaliy Kolesnik
Referees:
Mikael Sjöqvist (SWE)
Marc Wiegand (SUI)

0–1	34:07 – Volkov
0–2	35:54 – Mikhailis (PP)
0–3	47:27 – Assetov (Belgibayev)
0–4	54:26 – Savenkov (Yevdokimov)

14 min
Penalties
8 min
29
Shots
27

22 February; 19:00	Japan	14–0 (5–0, 4–0, 5–0)	China	Tsukisamu Gymnasium, Sapporo; Attendance: 1,197

Game reference

Yutaka Fukufuji
Takuto Onoda
Goalies
Xia Shengrong
Sun Zehao
Referees:
Brett Iverson (CAN)
Robin Šír (CZE)

Nishiwaki (H. Terao, Sato) – 03:30	1–0
Takahashi (Kawai) – 07:03	2–0
Kuji (Takahashi, Taka. Yamashita) – 10:08	3–0
Kuji (Takahashi, Hashiba) – 13:24	4–0
Haga (Hirano, Ueno) (PP) – 13:46	5–0
Furuhashi (Minoshima, Ueno) (PP) – 22:11	6–0
Mitamura (Kawai, Y. Terao) – 25:03	7–0
Ueno (Haga, Furuhashi) – 25:42	8–0
H. Terao (Hashiba, Ueno) – 32:33	9–0
Takagi (Furuhashi) (PP) – 41:34	10–0
Furuhashi (Haga) – 50:55	11–0
Hirano (Haga) (PP) – 54:04	12–0
Furuhashi (Ueno) – 56:25	13–0
Taku. Yamashita (Nishiwaki) – 57:56	14–0

8 min
Penalties
14 min
59
Shots
9

24 February; 15:30	Kazakhstan	8–0 (3–0, 3–0, 2–0)	China	Tsukisamu Gymnasium, Sapporo; Attendance: 483

Game reference

Sergey Kudryavtsev
Goalies
Sun Zehao
Referees:
Brett Iverson (CAN)
Marc Wiegand (SUI)

Volkov (Nuriyev, Mikhailis) (PP) – 09:21	1–0
Kovzalov (Savitskiy) – 13:26	2–0
Savenkov (Yevdokimov) – 15:03	3–0
Volkov (Nuriyev) – 23:00	4–0
Grents (Stepanenko) – 33:59	5–0
Savenkov (Yevdokimov) (PP) – 36:23	6–0
Savenkov (Antsiferov) – 45:43	7–0
Sagadeyev – 49:01	8–0

6 min
Penalties
24 min
76
Shots
19

24 February; 19:00	Japan	1–4 (0–1, 0–1, 1–2)	South Korea	Tsukisamu Gymnasium, Sapporo; Attendance: 2,118

Game reference

Yutaka Fukufuji
Goalies
Matt Dalton
Referees:
Robin Šír (CZE)
Mikael Sjöqvist (SWE)

	0–1	09:33 – Seo
	0–2	29:49 – Swift (Kim S.) (PP)
	0–3	52:04 – Kim W.Jung (Kim W.Jun, Swift)
Ueno (Hashiba, Taka. Yamashita) – 55:53	1–3
	1–4	58:55 – Park W. (Shin S.W., Dalton) (EN)

8 min
Penalties
6 min
28
Shots
32

26 February; 9:00	China	0–10 (0–2, 0–4, 0–4)	South Korea	Tsukisamu Gymnasium, Sapporo; Attendance: 344

Game reference

Sun Zehao
Goalies
Matt Dalton
Referees:
Robin Šír (CZE)
Marc Wiegand (SUI)

0–1	09:08 – Shin S.H. (Kim K., Regan)
0–2	11:10 – Shin S.H. (Kim K.) (PP)
0–3	20:56 – Kim S. (Seo, Shin S.H.)
0–4	22:34 – Swift (Kim W.Jun)
0–5	30:39 – Park W. (Cho, Lee D.) (PP)
0–6	34:11 – Park J.
0–7	41:41 – Shin S.H. (Kim W.Jun) (PP)
0–8	50:09 – Shin H. (Shin S.H.)
0–9	54:14 – Park J.
0–10	58:48 – Kim K.

12 min
Penalties
0 min
14
Shots
66

26 February; 12:30	Kazakhstan	7–0 (4–0, 2–0, 1–0)	Japan	Tsukisamu Gymnasium, Sapporo; Attendance: 1,631

Game reference

Vitaliy Kolesnik
Goalies
Yutaka Fukufuji
Takuto Onoda
Referees:
Brett Iverson (CAN)
Mikael Sjöqvist (SWE)

Yevdokimov (Antsiferov, Savenkov) – 00:31	1–0
Kovzalov (Grents) – 02:13	2–0
Savitskiy (Grents) – 04:46	3–0
Mikhailis (Volkov, Nuriyev) – 12:44	4–0
Yevdokimov (Antsiferov) – 29:39	5–0
Savenkov (Kurshuk) (PP) – 35:53	6–0
Kovzalov (Savitskiy, Lakiza) – 58:33	7–0

6 min
Penalties
20 min
41
Shots
12

== Final standing ==
Rank	Team	Pld	W	OW	OL	L
1st place, gold medalist(s)	Kazakhstan	3	3	0	0	0
2nd place, silver medalist(s)	South Korea	3	2	0	0	1
3rd place, bronze medalist(s)	Japan	3	1	0	0	2
4	China	3	0	0	0	3
5	Thailand	5	4	1	0	0
6	Chinese Taipei	5	3	1	1	0
7	United Arab Emirates	5	3	0	0	2
8	Mongolia	5	2	0	0	3
9	Hong Kong	5	1	0	1	3
10	Singapore	5	0	0	0	5
11	Turkmenistan	4	4	0	0	0
12	Kyrgyzstan	4	3	0	0	1
13	Philippines	4	3	0	0	1
14	Macau	4	2	0	0	2
15	Malaysia	3	1	0	0	2
16	Independent Olympic Athletes	3	1	0	0	2
17	Qatar	3	0	0	0	3
18	Indonesia	3	0	0	0	3
