= Ice hockey at the 2018 Winter Olympics – Men's team rosters =

These were the team rosters of the nations participating in the men's ice hockey tournament of the 2018 Winter Olympics. Each team was permitted a roster of 22 skaters and 3 goaltenders.

After five consecutive Olympic tournaments in which the National Hockey League (the world's premier professional league) allowed its players to participate in the Olympics and adjusted its schedule to accommodate the tournament, the NHL announced in 2017 that it would prohibit any player under NHL contract, including those not actually playing for an NHL team, from participating in the Olympics. The NHL secured the cooperation of the International Ice Hockey Federation and the IOC ensuring that nations would not be allowed to ask NHL players to participate.

Unlike the NHL, the vast majority of European leagues accommodated an Olympic break, headlined by Russia-based KHL's 33-day break, Sweden-based Swedish Hockey League's 14-day break, Switzerland-based National League's 25-day break, German-based Eishockey Liga's 26-day break, Czech Republic–based Extraliga's 18-day break, and Slovakia-based Tipsport liga's 14-day break. Conversely, Finland-based SM-liiga did not accommodate a break but allowed its top players to leave the clubs and participate in the Olympic Games.

== Statistics ==
=== Average age ===
Team Canada was the oldest team in the tournament, averaging 31 years. Gold medal winner Team Olympic Athletes from Russia was the youngest, averaging 28 years. The tournament average was 29 years and 6 months.

== Group A ==
=== Canada ===
The following is the Canadian roster for the men's ice hockey tournament at the 2018 Winter Olympics.

Head coach: (Canada) Willie Desjardins Assistant coaches: (Canada) Dave King, (Canada) Scott Walker, (Canada) Craig Woodcroft

No.	Pos.	Name	Height	Weight	Birthdate	Birthplace	2017–18 team
3	D	Karl Stollery	5 ft 11 in (1.80 m)	181 lb (82 kg)	November 21, 1987	Camrose, Alberta	(Latvia) Dinamo Riga (KHL)
4	D	Chris Lee – A	6 ft 0 in (1.83 m)	185 lb (84 kg)	October 3, 1980	MacTier, Ontario	(Russia) Metallurg Magnitogorsk (KHL)
5	D	Chay Genoway	5 ft 9 in (1.75 m)	176 lb (80 kg)	December 20, 1986	Morden, Manitoba	(Russia) HC Lada Togliatti (KHL)
7	F	Gilbert Brulé	5 ft 10 in (1.78 m)	190 lb (86 kg)	January 1, 1987	Edmonton, Alberta	(China) Kunlun Red Star (KHL)
8	F	Wojtek Wolski	6 ft 3 in (1.91 m)	220 lb (100 kg)	February 24, 1986	Zabrze, Poland	(Russia) Metallurg Magnitogorsk (KHL)
9	F	Derek Roy – A	5 ft 9 in (1.75 m)	187 lb (85 kg)	May 4, 1983	Rockland, Ontario	(Sweden) Linköpings HC (SHL)
11	F	Chris Kelly – C	6 ft 0 in (1.83 m)	194 lb (88 kg)	November 11, 1980	Toronto, Ontario	(Canada) Belleville Senators (AHL)
12	F	Rob Klinkhammer	6 ft 2 in (1.88 m)	216 lb (98 kg)	August 12, 1986	Lethbridge, Alberta	(Russia) Ak Bars Kazan (KHL)
15	F	Brandon Kozun	5 ft 8 in (1.73 m)	172 lb (78 kg)	March 8, 1990	Los Angeles, California, United States	(Russia) Lokomotiv Yaroslavl (KHL)
16	F	Quinton Howden	6 ft 2 in (1.88 m)	190 lb (86 kg)	January 21, 1992	Oakbank, Manitoba	(Belarus) HC Dinamo Minsk (KHL)
17	F	Rene Bourque – A	6 ft 2 in (1.88 m)	216 lb (98 kg)	December 10, 1981	Lac La Biche, Alberta	(Sweden) Djurgårdens IF (SHL)
18	D	Marc-André Gragnani	6 ft 3 in (1.91 m)	205 lb (93 kg)	March 11, 1987	L'Île-Bizard, Quebec	(Belarus) HC Dinamo Minsk (KHL)
19	F	Andrew Ebbett – A	5 ft 9 in (1.75 m)	176 lb (80 kg)	January 2, 1983	Vernon, British Columbia	(Switzerland) SC Bern (NL)
21	F	Mason Raymond	6 ft 1 in (1.85 m)	179 lb (81 kg)	September 17, 1985	Cochrane, Alberta	(Switzerland) SC Bern (NL)
22	F	Eric O'Dell	6 ft 1 in (1.85 m)	201 lb (91 kg)	June 21, 1990	Ottawa, Ontario	(Russia) HC Sochi (KHL)
24	D	Stefan Elliott	6 ft 1 in (1.85 m)	190 lb (86 kg)	January 30, 1991	Vancouver, British Columbia	(Sweden) HV71 (SHL)
27	D	Cody Goloubef	6 ft 1 in (1.85 m)	201 lb (91 kg)	November 30, 1989	Oakville, Ontario	(United States) Stockton Heat (AHL)
30	G	Ben Scrivens	6 ft 2 in (1.88 m)	198 lb (90 kg)	September 11, 1986	Spruce Grove, Alberta	(Russia) Salavat Yulaev Ufa (KHL)
31	G	Kevin Poulin	6 ft 2 in (1.88 m)	205 lb (93 kg)	April 12, 1990	Montreal, Quebec	(Switzerland) EHC Kloten (NL)
35	G	Justin Peters	6 ft 1 in (1.85 m)	209 lb (95 kg)	August 30, 1986	Blyth, Ontario	(Germany) Kölner Haie (DEL)
37	D	Mat Robinson	5 ft 9 in (1.75 m)	185 lb (84 kg)	June 20, 1986	Calgary, Alberta	(Russia) CSKA Moscow (KHL)
40	F	Maxim Lapierre	6 ft 0 in (1.83 m)	216 lb (98 kg)	March 29, 1985	Saint-Leonard, Quebec	(Switzerland) HC Lugano (NL)
56	D	Maxim Noreau – A	6 ft 0 in (1.83 m)	198 lb (90 kg)	May 24, 1987	Montreal, Quebec	(Switzerland) SC Bern (NL)
91	F	Linden Vey	6 ft 0 in (1.83 m)	190 lb (86 kg)	July 17, 1991	Wakaw, Saskatchewan	(Switzerland) ZSC Lions (NL)
92	F	Christian Thomas	5 ft 9 in (1.75 m)	174 lb (79 kg)	May 26, 1992	Toronto, Ontario	(United States) Wilkes-Barre/Scranton Penguins (AHL)

=== Czech Republic ===
The following is the Czech roster for the men's ice hockey tournament at the 2018 Winter Olympics.

Head coach: (Czech Republic) Josef Jandač Assistant coaches: (Czech Republic) Jiří Kalous, (Czech Republic) Václav Prospal, (Czech Republic) Jaroslav Špaček

No.	Pos.	Name	Height	Weight	Birthdate	Birthplace	2017–18 team
10	F	Roman Červenka	1.82 m (6 ft 0 in)	89 kg (196 lb)	10 December 1985	Prague, Czechoslovakia	(Switzerland) HC Fribourg-Gottéron (NL)
16	F	Michal Birner	1.83 m (6 ft 0 in)	83 kg (183 lb)	2 March 1986	Litoměřice, Czechoslovakia	(Switzerland) HC Fribourg-Gottéron (NL)
18	F	Dominik Kubalík	1.87 m (6 ft 2 in)	86 kg (190 lb)	21 August 1995	Plzeň	(Switzerland) HC Ambrì-Piotta (NL)
23	D	Ondřej Němec	1.82 m (6 ft 0 in)	93 kg (205 lb)	18 April 1984	Třebíč, Czechoslovakia	(Czech Republic) HC Kometa Brno (ELH)
27	F	Martin Růžička	1.81 m (5 ft 11 in)	81 kg (179 lb)	15 December 1985	Beroun, Czechoslovakia	(Czech Republic) HC Oceláři Třinec (ELH)
29	D	Jan Kolář – A	1.90 m (6 ft 3 in)	92 kg (203 lb)	22 November 1986	Pardubice, Czechoslovakia	(Russia) Amur Khabarovsk (KHL)
32	G	Patrik Bartošák	1.85 m (6 ft 1 in)	88 kg (194 lb)	29 March 1993	Kopřivnice	(Czech Republic) HC Vítkovice (ELH)
33	G	Pavel Francouz	1.82 m (6 ft 0 in)	81 kg (179 lb)	3 June 1990	Plzeň, Czechoslovakia	(Russia) Traktor Chelyabinsk (KHL)
38	G	Dominik Furch	1.88 m (6 ft 2 in)	91 kg (201 lb)	19 April 1990	Prague, Czechoslovakia	(Russia) Avangard Omsk (KHL)
42	F	Petr Koukal	1.77 m (5 ft 10 in)	83 kg (183 lb)	16 August 1982	Žďár nad Sázavou, Czechoslovakia	(Czech Republic) Mountfield HK (ELH)
43	F	Jan Kovář – A	1.81 m (5 ft 11 in)	98 kg (216 lb)	20 March 1990	Písek, Czechoslovakia	(Russia) Metallurg Magnitogorsk (KHL)
47	D	Michal Jordán	1.85 m (6 ft 1 in)	88 kg (194 lb)	17 July 1990	Zlín, Czechoslovakia	(Russia) Amur Khabarovsk (KHL)
51	F	Roman Horák	1.82 m (6 ft 0 in)	74 kg (163 lb)	21 May 1991	České Budějovice, Czechoslovakia	(Russia) HC Vityaz (KHL)
61	D	Adam Polášek	1.90 m (6 ft 3 in)	94 kg (207 lb)	12 July 1991	Ostrava, Czechoslovakia	(Russia) HC Sochi (KHL)
62	F	Michal Řepík	1.79 m (5 ft 10 in)	87 kg (192 lb)	31 December 1988	Vlašim, Czechoslovakia	(Czech Republic) HC Sparta Praha (ELH)
64	F	Jiří Sekáč	1.87 m (6 ft 2 in)	84 kg (185 lb)	10 June 1992	Kladno, Czechoslovakia	(Russia) Ak Bars Kazan (KHL)
65	D	Vojtěch Mozík	1.89 m (6 ft 2 in)	91 kg (201 lb)	26 December 1992	Prague, Czechoslovakia	(Russia) HC Vityaz (KHL)
69	F	Lukáš Radil	1.91 m (6 ft 3 in)	91 kg (201 lb)	5 August 1990	Čáslav, Czechoslovakia	(Russia) HC Spartak Moscow (KHL)
74	D	Ondřej Vitásek	1.93 m (6 ft 4 in)	103 kg (227 lb)	4 September 1990	Prostějov, Czechoslovakia	(Russia) HC Yugra (KHL)
79	F	Tomáš Zohorna	1.85 m (6 ft 1 in)	95 kg (209 lb)	3 January 1988	Chotěboř, Czechoslovakia	(Russia) Amur Khabarovsk (KHL)
82	F	Michal Vondrka	1.85 m (6 ft 1 in)	90 kg (200 lb)	17 May 1982	České Budějovice, Czechoslovakia	(Czech Republic) Piráti Chomutov (ELH)
84	D	Tomáš Kundrátek	1.88 m (6 ft 2 in)	94 kg (207 lb)	26 December 1989	Přerov, Czechoslovakia	(Russia) Torpedo Nizhny Novgorod (KHL)
86	F	Tomáš Mertl	1.75 m (5 ft 9 in)	82 kg (181 lb)	11 March 1986	České Budějovice, Czechoslovakia	(Czech Republic) HC Plzeň (ELH)
87	D	Jakub Nakládal	1.87 m (6 ft 2 in)	90 kg (200 lb)	30 December 1987	Pardubice, Czechoslovakia	(Russia) Lokomotiv Yaroslavl (KHL)
91	F	Martin Erat – C	1.79 m (5 ft 10 in)	90 kg (200 lb)	29 August 1981	Třebíč, Czechoslovakia	(Czech Republic) HC Kometa Brno (ELH)

=== South Korea ===
The following is the South Korean roster for the men's ice hockey tournament at the 2018 Winter Olympics.

Head coach: (Canada) Jim Paek Assistant coaches: (South Korea) Kim Woo-jae, (South Korea) Son Ho-seung, (United States) Richard Park

No.	Pos.	Name	Height	Weight	Birthdate	Birthplace	2017–18 team
1	G	Matt Dalton	1.87 m (6 ft 2 in)	89 kg (196 lb)	4 July 1986	Clinton, Ontario, Canada	(South Korea) Anyang Halla (ALIH)
2	D	Cho Hyung-gon	1.81 m (5 ft 11 in)	95 kg (209 lb)	23 June 1990	Uijeongbu	(South Korea) Sangmu
3	D	Seo Yeong-jun	1.83 m (6 ft 0 in)	80 kg (180 lb)	8 March 1995	Seoul	(South Korea) Daemyung Killer Whales (ALIH)
5	D	Bryan Young	1.86 m (6 ft 1 in)	88 kg (194 lb)	6 August 1986	Ennismore, Ontario, Canada	(South Korea) Daemyung Killer Whales (ALIH)
6	D	Kim Won-jun	1.78 m (5 ft 10 in)	81 kg (179 lb)	4 May 1991	Seoul	(South Korea) Anyang Halla (ALIH)
7	D	Oh Hyon-ho	1.75 m (5 ft 9 in)	77 kg (170 lb)	29 October 1986	Seoul	(South Korea) Daemyung Killer Whales (ALIH)
8	F	Kim Won-jung – A	1.82 m (6 ft 0 in)	82 kg (181 lb)	18 December 1984	Seoul	(South Korea) Anyang Halla (ALIH)
9	F	Jeon Jung-woo	1.75 m (5 ft 9 in)	75 kg (165 lb)	27 May 1994	South Korea	(South Korea) Sangmu
10	F	Michael Swift	1.78 m (5 ft 10 in)	80 kg (180 lb)	26 March 1987	Peterborough, Ontario, Canada	(South Korea) High1 (ALIH)
11	F	Kim Ki-sung	1.78 m (5 ft 10 in)	83 kg (183 lb)	14 May 1985	Seoul	(South Korea) Anyang Halla (ALIH)
13	F	Lee Young-jun	1.84 m (6 ft 0 in)	75 kg (165 lb)	3 January 1991	South Korea	(South Korea) Daemyung Killer Whales (ALIH)
19	F	Kim Sang-wook	1.80 m (5 ft 11 in)	85 kg (187 lb)	21 April 1988	Seoul	(South Korea) Anyang Halla (ALIH)
22	F	Mike Testwuide – A	1.96 m (6 ft 5 in)	95 kg (209 lb)	5 February 1987	Vail, Colorado, United States	(South Korea) High1 (ALIH)
23	D	Eric Regan	1.88 m (6 ft 2 in)	95 kg (209 lb)	20 May 1988	Whitby, Ontario, Canada	(South Korea) Anyang Halla (ALIH)
25	F	Brock Radunske	1.96 m (6 ft 5 in)	95 kg (209 lb)	5 April 1983	Kitchener, Ontario, Canada	(South Korea) Anyang Halla (ALIH)
27	F	Ahn Jin-hui	1.81 m (5 ft 11 in)	84 kg (185 lb)	6 March 1991	Seoul	(South Korea) Sangmu
36	F	Park Woo-sang – C	1.92 m (6 ft 4 in)	88 kg (194 lb)	30 May 1985	Seoul	(South Korea) Anyang Halla (ALIH)
41	G	Park Kye-hoon	1.84 m (6 ft 0 in)	83 kg (183 lb)	9 February 1992	Gyeongsang	(South Korea) Sangmu
44	D	Alex Plante – A	1.98 m (6 ft 6 in)	104 kg (229 lb)	9 May 1989	Brandon, Manitoba, Canada	(South Korea) Anyang Halla (ALIH)
47	F	Shin Sang-hoon	1.71 m (5 ft 7 in)	76 kg (168 lb)	1 August 1993	Seoul	(South Korea) Sangmu
50	G	Park Sung-je	1.73 m (5 ft 8 in)	82 kg (181 lb)	3 August 1988	Seoul	(South Korea) High1 (ALIH)
61	D	Lee Don-ku	1.80 m (5 ft 11 in)	88 kg (194 lb)	7 February 1988	Seoul	(South Korea) Anyang Halla (ALIH)
63	F	Park Jin-kyu	1.75 m (5 ft 9 in)	83 kg (183 lb)	18 December 1991	South Korea	(South Korea) Sangmu
87	F	Cho Min-ho – A	1.75 m (5 ft 9 in)	83 kg (183 lb)	4 January 1987	Seoul	(South Korea) Anyang Halla (ALIH)
96	F	Shin Sang-woo	1.75 m (5 ft 9 in)	83 kg (183 lb)	12 December 1987	Seoul	(South Korea) Anyang Halla (ALIH)

=== Switzerland ===
The following is the Swiss roster for the men's ice hockey tournament at the 2018 Winter Olympics.

Head coach: (Switzerland) Patrick Fischer Assistant coaches: (Switzerland) Christian Wohlwend, (Sweden) Tommy Albelin

No.	Pos.	Name	Height	Weight	Birthdate	Birthplace	2017–18 team
1	G	Jonas Hiller	1.87 m (6 ft 2 in)	87 kg (192 lb)	12 February 1982	Felben-Wellhausen	(Switzerland) EHC Biel (NL)
4	D	Patrick Geering	1.78 m (5 ft 10 in)	87 kg (192 lb)	12 February 1990	Zürich	(Switzerland) ZSC Lions (NL)
8	F	Vincent Praplan	1.81 m (5 ft 11 in)	84 kg (185 lb)	10 June 1994	Sierre	(Switzerland) EHC Kloten (NL)
9	F	Thomas Rüfenacht	1.80 m (5 ft 11 in)	85 kg (187 lb)	22 February 1985	Meggen	(Switzerland) SC Bern (NL)
10	F	Andres Ambühl – A	1.76 m (5 ft 9 in)	85 kg (187 lb)	14 September 1983	Davos	(Switzerland) HC Davos (NL)
13	D	Félicien Du Bois	1.87 m (6 ft 2 in)	85 kg (187 lb)	18 October 1983	Neuchâtel	(Switzerland) HC Davos (NL)
15	F	Grégory Hofmann	1.84 m (6 ft 0 in)	90 kg (200 lb)	13 November 1992	Biel	(Switzerland) HC Lugano (NL)
16	D	Raphael Diaz	1.81 m (5 ft 11 in)	88 kg (194 lb)	9 January 1986	Baar	(Switzerland) EV Zug (NL)
19	F	Reto Schäppi	1.94 m (6 ft 4 in)	98 kg (216 lb)	27 January 1991	Horgen	(Switzerland) ZSC Lions (NL)
23	F	Simon Bodenmann	1.78 m (5 ft 10 in)	83 kg (183 lb)	2 March 1988	Urnäsch	(Switzerland) SC Bern (NL)
27	D	Dominik Schlumpf	1.82 m (6 ft 0 in)	79 kg (174 lb)	3 March 1991	Mönchaltorf	(Switzerland) EV Zug (NL)
44	F	Pius Suter	1.80 m (5 ft 11 in)	80 kg (180 lb)	24 May 1996	Zürich	(Switzerland) ZSC Lions (NL)
52	G	Tobias Stephan	1.91 m (6 ft 3 in)	87 kg (192 lb)	21 January 1984	Zürich	(Switzerland) EV Zug (NL)
54	D	Philippe Furrer – C	1.86 m (6 ft 1 in)	92 kg (203 lb)	16 June 1985	Bern	(Switzerland) HC Lugano (NL)
55	D	Romain Loeffel	1.78 m (5 ft 10 in)	84 kg (185 lb)	10 March 1991	La Chaux-de-Fonds	(Switzerland) Genève-Servette HC (NL)
58	D	Eric Blum	1.78 m (5 ft 10 in)	82 kg (181 lb)	13 June 1986	Pfaffnau	(Switzerland) SC Bern (NL)
60	F	Tristan Scherwey	1.76 m (5 ft 9 in)	85 kg (187 lb)	7 May 1991	Wünnewil-Flamatt	(Switzerland) SC Bern (NL)
61	F	Fabrice Herzog	1.89 m (6 ft 2 in)	87 kg (192 lb)	9 December 1994	Frauenfeld	(Switzerland) ZSC Lions (NL)
63	G	Leonardo Genoni	1.80 m (5 ft 11 in)	80 kg (180 lb)	28 August 1987	Semione	(Switzerland) SC Bern (NL)
65	D	Ramon Untersander	1.84 m (6 ft 0 in)	86 kg (190 lb)	21 January 1991	Alt St. Johann	(Switzerland) SC Bern (NL)
70	F	Denis Hollenstein	1.83 m (6 ft 0 in)	88 kg (194 lb)	15 October 1989	Zürich	(Switzerland) EHC Kloten (NL)
71	F	Enzo Corvi	1.83 m (6 ft 0 in)	86 kg (190 lb)	23 December 1992	Chur	(Switzerland) HC Davos (NL)
82	F	Simon Moser – A	1.87 m (6 ft 2 in)	95 kg (209 lb)	10 March 1989	Bern	(Switzerland) SC Bern (NL)
89	F	Cody Almond	1.88 m (6 ft 2 in)	99 kg (218 lb)	24 July 1989	Calgary, Alberta, Canada	(Switzerland) Genève-Servette HC (NL)
92	F	Gaëtan Haas	1.82 m (6 ft 0 in)	83 kg (183 lb)	31 January 1992	Bonfol	(Switzerland) SC Bern (NL)

Forward Joël Vermin was also selected but was unable to participate due to injury. He was replaced by Grégory Hofmann.

== Group B ==
=== Olympic Athletes from Russia ===
The following is the Olympic Athletes from Russia roster for the men's ice hockey tournament at the 2018 Winter Olympics.

Head coach: (Russia) Oleg Znarok Assistant coaches: (Latvia) Harijs Vītoliņš, (Russia) Rashit Davydov, (Russia) Igor Nikitin, (Russia) Alexei Zhamnov

No.	Pos.	Name	Height	Weight	Birthdate	Birthplace	2017–18 team
2	D	Artyom Zub	1.88 m (6 ft 2 in)	90 kg (198 lb)	3 October 1995	Khabarovsk	(Russia) SKA Saint Petersburg (KHL)
4	D	Vladislav Gavrikov	1.90 m (6 ft 3 in)	97 kg (214 lb)	21 November 1995	Yaroslavl	(Russia) SKA Saint Petersburg (KHL)
7	F	Ivan Telegin	1.93 m (6 ft 4 in)	90 kg (198 lb)	28 February 1992	Novokuznetsk	(Russia) HC CSKA Moscow (KHL)
10	F	Sergei Mozyakin	1.80 m (5 ft 11 in)	84 kg (185 lb)	30 March 1981	Yaroslavl, Russian SFSR, Soviet Union	(Russia) Metallurg Magnitogorsk (KHL)
11	F	Sergei Andronov – A	1.89 m (6 ft 2 in)	96 kg (212 lb)	19 July 1989	Penza, Russian SFSR, Soviet Union	(Russia) HC CSKA Moscow (KHL)
13	F	Pavel Datsyuk – C	1.82 m (6 ft 0 in)	86 kg (190 lb)	20 July 1978	Sverdlovsk, Russian SFSR, Soviet Union	(Russia) SKA Saint Petersburg (KHL)
21	F	Sergey Kalinin	1.90 m (6 ft 3 in)	86 kg (190 lb)	17 March 1991	Omsk, Russian SFSR, Soviet Union	(Russia) SKA Saint Petersburg (KHL)
25	F	Mikhail Grigorenko	1.91 m (6 ft 3 in)	91 kg (201 lb)	16 May 1994	Khabarovsk	(Russia) HC CSKA Moscow (KHL)
26	D	Vyacheslav Voynov	1.82 m (6 ft 0 in)	91 kg (201 lb)	15 January 1990	Chelyabinsk, Russian SFSR, Soviet Union	(Russia) SKA Saint Petersburg (KHL)
28	D	Andrei Zubarev	1.85 m (6 ft 1 in)	101 kg (223 lb)	3 March 1987	Ufa, Russian SFSR, Soviet Union	(Russia) SKA Saint Petersburg (KHL)
29	F	Ilya Kablukov	1.89 m (6 ft 2 in)	88 kg (194 lb)	18 January 1988	Moscow, Russian SFSR, Soviet Union	(Russia) SKA Saint Petersburg (KHL)
30	G	Igor Shestyorkin	1.86 m (6 ft 1 in)	86 kg (190 lb)	30 December 1995	Moscow	(Russia) SKA Saint Petersburg (KHL)
31	G	Ilya Sorokin	1.88 m (6 ft 2 in)	80 kg (176 lb)	4 August 1995	Mezhdurechensk	(Russia) HC CSKA Moscow (KHL)
44	D	Egor Yakovlev	1.82 m (6 ft 0 in)	87 kg (192 lb)	17 September 1991	Magnitogorsk, Russian SFSR, Soviet Union	(Russia) SKA Saint Petersburg (KHL)
52	F	Sergei Shirokov	1.79 m (5 ft 10 in)	89 kg (196 lb)	10 March 1986	Moscow, Russian SFSR, Soviet Union	(Russia) SKA Saint Petersburg (KHL)
53	D	Alexey Marchenko	1.88 m (6 ft 2 in)	96 kg (212 lb)	2 January 1992	Moscow	(Russia) HC CSKA Moscow (KHL)
55	D	Bogdan Kiselevich	1.84 m (6 ft 0 in)	94 kg (207 lb)	14 February 1990	Cherepovets, Russian SFSR, Soviet Union	(Russia) HC CSKA Moscow (KHL)
71	F	Ilya Kovalchuk – A	1.90 m (6 ft 3 in)	103 kg (227 lb)	15 April 1983	Kalinin, Russian SFSR, Soviet Union	(Russia) SKA Saint Petersburg (KHL)
74	F	Nikolai Prokhorkin	1.89 m (6 ft 2 in)	91 kg (201 lb)	17 September 1993	Chelyabinsk	(Russia) SKA Saint Petersburg (KHL)
77	F	Kirill Kaprizov	1.78 m (5 ft 10 in)	87 kg (192 lb)	26 April 1997	Novokuznetsk	(Russia) HC CSKA Moscow (KHL)
83	G	Vasily Koshechkin	2.00 m (6 ft 7 in)	110 kg (243 lb)	27 March 1983	Tolyatti, Russian SFSR, Soviet Union	(Russia) Metallurg Magnitogorsk (KHL)
87	F	Vadim Shipachyov	1.85 m (6 ft 1 in)	86 kg (190 lb)	12 March 1987	Cherepovets, Russian SFSR, Soviet Union	(Russia) SKA Saint Petersburg (KHL)
89	D	Nikita Nesterov	1.80 m (5 ft 11 in)	83 kg (183 lb)	28 March 1993	Chelyabinsk	(Russia) HC CSKA Moscow (KHL)
94	F	Alexander Barabanov	1.79 m (5 ft 10 in)	89 kg (196 lb)	17 June 1994	Saint Petersburg	(Russia) SKA Saint Petersburg (KHL)
97	F	Nikita Gusev	1.80 m (5 ft 11 in)	82 kg (181 lb)	8 July 1992	Moscow	(Russia) SKA Saint Petersburg (KHL)

=== Slovakia ===
The following is the Slovak roster for the men's ice hockey tournament at the 2018 Winter Olympics.

Head coach: (Canada) Craig Ramsay Assistant coaches: (Slovakia) Ján Lašák, (Slovakia) Vladimír Országh

No.	Pos.	Name	Height	Weight	Birthdate	Birthplace	2017–18 team
6	F	Lukáš Cingeľ	1.87 m (6 ft 2 in)	91 kg (201 lb)	10 June 1992	Žilina, Czechoslovakia	(Czech Republic) HK Hradec Králové (ELH)
7	D	Ivan Baranka	1.88 m (6 ft 2 in)	91 kg (201 lb)	19 May 1985	Ilava, Czechoslovakia	(Czech Republic) HC Vítkovice Ridera (ELH)
13	F	Michal Krištof	1.76 m (5 ft 9 in)	74 kg (163 lb)	11 October 1993	Nitra	(Slovakia) HK Nitra (SVK)
14	D	Peter Čerešňák	1.91 m (6 ft 3 in)	97 kg (214 lb)	26 January 1993	Trenčín	(Czech Republic) HC Škoda Plzeň (ELH)
16	D	Juraj Valach	2.02 m (6 ft 8 in)	101 kg (223 lb)	1 February 1989	Topoľčany, Czechoslovakia	(Czech Republic) Piráti Chomutov (ELH)
17	F	Miloš Bubela	1.88 m (6 ft 2 in)	88 kg (194 lb)	25 August 1992	Banská Bystrica, Czechoslovakia	(Slovakia) HC '05 Banská Bystrica (SVK)
18	F	Andrej Kudrna	1.89 m (6 ft 2 in)	97 kg (214 lb)	11 May 1991	Nové Zámky, Czechoslovakia	(Czech Republic) HC Sparta Praha (ELH)
19	D	Tomáš Starosta	1.81 m (5 ft 11 in)	91 kg (201 lb)	20 May 1981	Trenčín, Czechoslovakia	(Slovakia) HK Dukla Trenčín (SVK)
25	F	Marek Hovorka	1.78 m (5 ft 10 in)	84 kg (185 lb)	8 October 1984	Dubnica nad Váhom, Czechoslovakia	(Slovakia) HC Košice (SVK)
26	D	Juraj Mikuš	1.94 m (6 ft 4 in)	97 kg (214 lb)	30 November 1988	Trenčín, Czechoslovakia	(Czech Republic) HC Sparta Praha (ELH)
27	F	Ladislav Nagy – A	1.79 m (5 ft 10 in)	86 kg (190 lb)	1 June 1979	Šaca, Czechoslovakia	(Slovakia) HC Košice (SVK)
33	G	Patrik Rybár	1.90 m (6 ft 3 in)	83 kg (183 lb)	9 November 1993	Skalica	(Czech Republic) HK Hradec Králové (ELH)
42	G	Branislav Konrád	1.88 m (6 ft 2 in)	90 kg (200 lb)	10 October 1987	Nitra, Czechoslovakia	(Czech Republic) HC Olomouc (ELH)
43	F	Tomáš Surový – C	1.84 m (6 ft 0 in)	96 kg (212 lb)	24 September 1981	Banská Bystrica, Czechoslovakia	(Slovakia) HC '05 Banská Bystrica (SVK)
50	G	Ján Laco	1.85 m (6 ft 1 in)	95 kg (209 lb)	1 December 1981	Liptovský Mikuláš, Czechoslovakia	(Czech Republic) HC Sparta Praha (ELH)
51	D	Dominik Graňák – A	1.82 m (6 ft 0 in)	83 kg (183 lb)	11 June 1983	Havířov, Czechoslovakia	(Czech Republic) HK Hradec Králové (ELH)
56	D	Michal Čajkovský	1.92 m (6 ft 4 in)	107 kg (236 lb)	6 May 1992	Skalica, Czechoslovakia	(Russia) Avtomobilist Yekaterinburg (KHL)
63	F	Patrik Lamper	1.84 m (6 ft 0 in)	86 kg (190 lb)	10 March 1993	Banská Bystrica	(Slovakia) HC '05 Banská Bystrica (SVK)
65	F	Tomáš Marcinko	1.94 m (6 ft 4 in)	96 kg (212 lb)	11 April 1988	Poprad, Czechoslovakia	(Czech Republic) HC Oceláři Třinec (ELH)
67	F	Matej Paulovič	1.90 m (6 ft 3 in)	90 kg (200 lb)	13 January 1995	Topoľčany	(Slovakia) HK Nitra (SVK)
71	D	Marek Ďaloga	1.93 m (6 ft 4 in)	88 kg (194 lb)	10 March 1989	Zvolen, Czechoslovakia	(Czech Republic) HC Sparta Praha (ELH)
83	F	Martin Bakoš	1.88 m (6 ft 2 in)	93 kg (205 lb)	18 April 1990	Spišská Nová Ves, Czechoslovakia	(Czech Republic) HC Bílí Tygři Liberec (ELH)
85	F	Peter Ölvecký	1.88 m (6 ft 2 in)	94 kg (207 lb)	11 October 1985	Nové Zámky, Czechoslovakia	(Slovakia) HK Dukla Trenčín (SVK)
87	F	Marcel Haščák	1.82 m (6 ft 0 in)	95 kg (209 lb)	3 February 1987	Poprad, Czechoslovakia	(Czech Republic) HC Kometa Brno (ELH)
91	F	Matúš Sukeľ	1.76 m (5 ft 9 in)	77 kg (170 lb)	23 January 1996	Liptovský Mikuláš	(Slovakia) MHk 32 Liptovský Mikuláš (SVK)

=== Slovenia ===
The following is the Slovenian roster for the men's ice hockey tournament at the 2018 Winter Olympics.

Head coach: (Finland) Kari Savolainen Assistant coaches: (Slovenia) Nik Zupančič, (Slovenia) Edo Terglav

No.	Pos.	Name	Height	Weight	Birthdate	Birthplace	2017–18 team
8	F	Žiga Jeglič	1.85 m (6 ft 1 in)	80 kg (180 lb)	24 February 1988	Kranj, SR Slovenia, SFR Yugoslavia	(Russia) Neftekhimik Nizhnekamsk (KHL)
12	F	David Rodman	1.85 m (6 ft 1 in)	83 kg (183 lb)	10 September 1983	Jesenice, SR Slovenia, SFR Yugoslavia	(France) Brûleurs de Loups (Ligue Magnus)
14	D	Matic Podlipnik	1.81 m (5 ft 11 in)	85 kg (187 lb)	9 August 1992	Jesenice	(Czech Republic) Energie Karlovy Vary (WSM Liga)
15	D	Blaž Gregorc	1.90 m (6 ft 3 in)	94 kg (207 lb)	18 January 1990	Jesenice, SR Slovenia, SFR Yugoslavia	(Czech Republic) Mountfield HK (ELH)
16	F	Aleš Mušič	1.76 m (5 ft 9 in)	83 kg (183 lb)	28 June 1982	Ljubljana, SR Slovenia, SFR Yugoslavia	(Hungary) Alba Volán Székesfehérvár (EBEL)
17	D	Žiga Pavlin	1.93 m (6 ft 4 in)	95 kg (209 lb)	30 April 1985	Kranj, SR Slovenia, SFR Yugoslavia	(Czech Republic) Motor České Budějovice (WSM Liga)
18	F	Ken Ograjenšek	1.75 m (5 ft 9 in)	82 kg (181 lb)	30 August 1991	Celje	(Austria) Graz 99ers (EBEL)
19	F	Žiga Pance	1.85 m (6 ft 1 in)	92 kg (203 lb)	1 January 1989	Ljubljana, SR Slovenia, SFR Yugoslavia	(Austria) Dornbirner EC (EBEL)
22	F	Marcel Rodman	1.86 m (6 ft 1 in)	85 kg (187 lb)	25 September 1981	Jesenice, SR Slovenia, SFR Yugoslavia	(Germany) EC Bad Tölz (Oberliga)
23	D	Luka Vidmar	1.85 m (6 ft 1 in)	90 kg (200 lb)	17 May 1986	Ljubljana, SR Slovenia, SFR Yugoslavia	(Hungary) Alba Volán Székesfehérvár (EBEL)
24	F	Rok Tičar – A	1.80 m (5 ft 11 in)	83 kg (183 lb)	3 May 1989	Jesenice, SR Slovenia, SFR Yugoslavia	(Russia) Sibir Novosibirsk (KHL)
26	F	Jan Urbas	1.92 m (6 ft 4 in)	98 kg (216 lb)	26 January 1989	Ljubljana, SR Slovenia, SFR Yugoslavia	(Germany) Fischtown Pinguins (DEL)
28	D	Aleš Kranjc	1.81 m (5 ft 11 in)	92 kg (203 lb)	29 July 1983	Jesenice, SR Slovenia, SFR Yugoslavia	(Germany) ETC Crimmitschau (DEL2)
32	G	Gašper Krošelj	1.88 m (6 ft 2 in)	88 kg (194 lb)	9 February 1987	Ljubljana, SR Slovenia, SFR Yugoslavia	(Denmark) Rødovre Mighty Bulls (Metal Ligaen)
39	F	Jan Muršak – C	1.80 m (5 ft 11 in)	84 kg (185 lb)	20 January 1988	Maribor, SR Slovenia, SFR Yugoslavia	(Sweden) Frölunda HC (SHL)
40	G	Luka Gračnar	1.78 m (5 ft 10 in)	83 kg (183 lb)	31 October 1993	Jesenice	(Austria) EC Red Bull Salzburg (EBEL)
51	D	Mitja Robar – A	1.76 m (5 ft 9 in)	85 kg (187 lb)	4 January 1983	Maribor, SR Slovenia, SFR Yugoslavia	(Austria) EC KAC (EBEL)
55	F	Robert Sabolič	1.83 m (6 ft 0 in)	90 kg (200 lb)	18 September 1988	Jesenice, SR Slovenia, SFR Yugoslavia	(Russia) Torpedo Nizhni Novgorod (KHL)
61	D	Jurij Repe	1.88 m (6 ft 2 in)	88 kg (194 lb)	17 September 1994	Kranj	(Czech Republic) Rytíři Kladno (WSM Liga)
69	G	Matija Pintarič	1.81 m (5 ft 11 in)	83 kg (183 lb)	11 August 1989	Maribor, SR Slovenia, SFR Yugoslavia	(France) Rouen Dragons (Ligue Magnus)
71	F	Boštjan Goličič	1.83 m (6 ft 0 in)	89 kg (196 lb)	12 June 1989	Kranj, SR Slovenia, SFR Yugoslavia	(France) Brûleurs de Loups (Ligue Magnus)
84	F	Andrej Hebar	1.80 m (5 ft 11 in)	83 kg (183 lb)	7 September 1984	Ljubljana, SR Slovenia, SFR Yugoslavia	(Slovenia) Olimpija (AlpsHL)
86	D	Sabahudin Kovačević	1.90 m (6 ft 3 in)	95 kg (209 lb)	26 February 1986	Jesenice, SR Slovenia, SFR Yugoslavia	(Czech Republic) Energie Karlovy Vary (WSM Liga)
91	F	Miha Verlič	1.94 m (6 ft 4 in)	85 kg (187 lb)	21 August 1991	Maribor	(Austria) EC VSV (EBEL)
92	F	Anže Kuralt	1.73 m (5 ft 8 in)	85 kg (187 lb)	31 October 1991	Kranj	(France) Gothiques d'Amiens (Ligue Magnus)

=== United States ===
The following is the American roster for the men's ice hockey tournament at the 2018 Winter Olympics.

Head coach: (United States) Tony Granato Assistant coaches: (United States) Keith Allain, (United States) Chris Chelios, (United States) Scott Young

No.	Pos.	Name	Height	Weight	Birthdate	Birthplace	2017–18 team
4	D	Chad Billins	5 ft 8 in (173 cm)	174 lb (79 kg)	May 26, 1989	Marysville, Michigan	(Sweden) Linköpings HC (SHL)
5	D	Noah Welch – A	6 ft 4 in (193 cm)	220 lb (100 kg)	August 26, 1982	Brighton, Massachusetts	(Sweden) Växjö Lakers (SHL)
7	F	John McCarthy	6 ft 1 in (185 cm)	194 lb (88 kg)	August 9, 1986	Boston, Massachusetts	(United States) San Jose Barracuda (AHL)
9	F	Brian O'Neill	5 ft 9 in (175 cm)	172 lb (78 kg)	June 1, 1988	Yardley, Pennsylvania	(Finland) Jokerit (KHL)
11	F	Garrett Roe	5 ft 8 in (173 cm)	181 lb (82 kg)	February 22, 1988	Vienna, Virginia	(Switzerland) EV Zug (NL)
12	F	Brian Gionta – C	5 ft 7 in (170 cm)	179 lb (81 kg)	January 18, 1979	Rochester, New York	Free agent
13	D	Ryan Gunderson	5 ft 10 in (178 cm)	174 lb (79 kg)	August 16, 1985	Bensalem, Pennsylvania	(Sweden) Brynäs IF (SHL)
14	F	Broc Little	5 ft 9 in (175 cm)	170 lb (77 kg)	March 24, 1988	Phoenix, Arizona	(Switzerland) HC Davos (NL)
15	F	Bobby Butler	6 ft 0 in (183 cm)	190 lb (86 kg)	April 26, 1987	Marlborough, Massachusetts	(United States) Milwaukee Admirals (AHL)
16	F	Ryan Donato	6 ft 0 in (183 cm)	192 lb (87 kg)	April 9, 1996	Scituate, Massachusetts	(United States) Harvard Crimson (ECAC)
17	F	Chris Bourque	5 ft 8 in (173 cm)	174 lb (79 kg)	January 29, 1986	Boston, Massachusetts	(United States) Hershey Bears (AHL)
18	F	Jordan Greenway	6 ft 6 in (198 cm)	227 lb (103 kg)	February 16, 1997	Canton, New York	(United States) Boston University Terriers (HE)
19	F	Jim Slater	6 ft 0 in (183 cm)	190 lb (86 kg)	December 9, 1982	Lapeer, Michigan	(Switzerland) HC Fribourg-Gottéron (NL)
20	D	Will Borgen	6 ft 2 in (188 cm)	187 lb (85 kg)	December 19, 1996	Moorhead, Minnesota	(United States) St. Cloud State Huskies (NCHC)
21	D	James Wisniewski	5 ft 11 in (180 cm)	203 lb (92 kg)	February 21, 1984	Canton, Michigan	(Germany) EC Kassel Huskies (DEL2)
22	D	Bobby Sanguinetti	6 ft 3 in (191 cm)	190 lb (86 kg)	February 29, 1988	Trenton, New Jersey	(Switzerland) HC Lugano (NL)
23	F	Troy Terry	6 ft 1 in (185 cm)	174 lb (79 kg)	September 10, 1997	Highlands Ranch, Colorado	(United States) Denver Pioneers (NCHC)
24	D	Jonathon Blum	6 ft 1 in (185 cm)	187 lb (85 kg)	January 30, 1989	Long Beach, California	(Russia) HC Sochi (KHL)
26	F	Mark Arcobello	5 ft 8 in (173 cm)	174 lb (79 kg)	August 12, 1988	Milford, Connecticut	(Switzerland) SC Bern (NL)
30	G	Ryan Zapolski	6 ft 0 in (183 cm)	203 lb (92 kg)	November 11, 1986	Erie, Pennsylvania	(Finland) Jokerit (KHL)
31	G	Brandon Maxwell	6 ft 1 in (185 cm)	196 lb (89 kg)	March 22, 1991	Winter Park, Florida	(Czech Republic) BK Mladá Boleslav (ELH)
35	G	David Leggio	6 ft 0 in (183 cm)	185 lb (84 kg)	July 31, 1984	Williamsville, New York	(Germany) EHC Red Bull München (DEL)
42	F	Chad Kolarik	5 ft 11 in (180 cm)	183 lb (83 kg)	January 26, 1986	Abington, Pennsylvania	(Germany) Adler Mannheim (DEL)
94	F	Ryan Stoa	6 ft 3 in (191 cm)	212 lb (96 kg)	April 13, 1987	Bloomington, Minnesota	(Russia) HC Spartak Moscow (KHL)
97	D	Matt Gilroy – A	6 ft 2 in (188 cm)	203 lb (92 kg)	July 30, 1984	North Bellmore, New York	(Finland) Jokerit (KHL)

== Group C ==
=== Finland ===
The following is the Finnish roster for the men's ice hockey tournament at the 2018 Winter Olympics.

Head coach: (Finland) Lauri Marjamäki Assistant coaches: (Finland) Ari Hilli, (Finland) Mikko Manner, (Finland) Jussi Tapola

No.	Pos.	Name	Height	Weight	Birthdate	Birthplace	2017–18 team
2	D	Mikko Lehtonen	1.83 m (6 ft 0 in)	88 kg (194 lb)	16 January 1994	Turku	(Finland) Tappara (Liiga)
4	D	Tommi Kivistö	1.86 m (6 ft 1 in)	94 kg (207 lb)	7 June 1991	Vantaa	(Finland) Jokerit (KHL)
5	D	Lasse Kukkonen – C	1.84 m (6 ft 0 in)	85 kg (187 lb)	18 September 1981	Oulu	(Finland) Kärpät (Liiga)
12	F	Marko Anttila	2.03 m (6 ft 8 in)	104 kg (229 lb)	27 May 1985	Lempäälä	(Finland) Jokerit (KHL)
13	F	Julius Junttila	1.78 m (5 ft 10 in)	81 kg (179 lb)	15 August 1991	Oulu	(Finland) Kärpät (Liiga)
18	D	Sami Lepistö – A	1.83 m (6 ft 0 in)	87 kg (192 lb)	17 October 1984	Espoo	(Finland) Jokerit (KHL)
19	G	Mikko Koskinen	2.01 m (6 ft 7 in)	95 kg (209 lb)	18 July 1988	Vantaa	(Russia) SKA Saint Petersburg (KHL)
20	F	Eeli Tolvanen	1.79 m (5 ft 10 in)	82 kg (181 lb)	22 April 1999	Vihti	(Finland) Jokerit (KHL)
23	F	Joonas Kemppainen	1.90 m (6 ft 3 in)	102 kg (225 lb)	7 April 1988	Kajaani	(Russia) Salavat Yulaev Ufa (KHL)
24	F	Jani Lajunen	1.89 m (6 ft 2 in)	94 kg (207 lb)	16 June 1990	Espoo	(Switzerland) HC Lugano (NL)
25	F	Jonas Enlund	1.83 m (6 ft 0 in)	86 kg (190 lb)	3 November 1987	Helsinki	(Russia) Sibir Novosibirsk (KHL)
27	F	Petri Kontiola – A	1.83 m (6 ft 0 in)	97 kg (214 lb)	4 October 1984	Seinäjoki	(Russia) Lokomotiv Yaroslavl (KHL)
31	G	Karri Rämö	1.88 m (6 ft 2 in)	93 kg (205 lb)	1 July 1986	Asikkala	(Finland) Jokerit (KHL)
37	F	Mika Pyörälä	1.82 m (6 ft 0 in)	81 kg (179 lb)	13 July 1981	Oulu	(Switzerland) SC Bern (NL)
38	D	Juuso Hietanen	1.80 m (5 ft 11 in)	85 kg (187 lb)	14 June 1985	Hämeenlinna	(Russia) Dynamo Moscow (KHL)
40	F	Jarno Koskiranta	1.92 m (6 ft 4 in)	92 kg (203 lb)	9 December 1986	Paimio	(Russia) SKA Saint Petersburg (KHL)
42	D	Miro Heiskanen	1.84 m (6 ft 0 in)	83 kg (183 lb)	18 July 1999	Espoo	(Finland) HIFK (Liiga)
50	D	Miika Koivisto	1.84 m (6 ft 0 in)	87 kg (192 lb)	20 July 1990	Vaasa	(Finland) Kärpät (Liiga)
55	D	Atte Ohtamaa	1.88 m (6 ft 2 in)	96 kg (212 lb)	6 November 1987	Nivala	(Russia) Ak Bars Kazan (KHL)
62	F	Oskar Osala	1.94 m (6 ft 4 in)	110 kg (240 lb)	26 December 1987	Vaasa	(Russia) Metallurg Magnitogorsk (KHL)
65	F	Sakari Manninen	1.72 m (5 ft 8 in)	76 kg (168 lb)	10 February 1992	Oulu	(Sweden) Örebro HK (SHL)
70	F	Teemu Hartikainen	1.86 m (6 ft 1 in)	104 kg (229 lb)	3 May 1990	Kuopio	(Russia) Salavat Yulaev Ufa (KHL)
77	G	Juha Metsola	1.77 m (5 ft 10 in)	69 kg (152 lb)	24 February 1989	Tampere	(Russia) Amur Khabarovsk (KHL)
81	F	Jukka Peltola	1.84 m (6 ft 0 in)	85 kg (187 lb)	26 August 1987	Tampere	(Finland) Tappara (Liiga)
86	F	Veli-Matti Savinainen	1.82 m (6 ft 0 in)	82 kg (181 lb)	5 January 1986	Espoo	(Russia) Yugra (KHL)

=== Germany ===
A preliminary 30-man German roster for the men's ice hockey tournament at the 2018 Winter Olympics was released on 16 January 2018. The final roster was announced on 23 January 2017, with 5 players being cut, including Daniel Pietta who was injured prior to the final announcement.

Head coach: (Germany) Marco Sturm Assistant coaches: (Germany) Christian Künast, (United States) Matt McIlvane

No.	Pos.	Name	Height	Weight	Birthdate	Birthplace	2017–18 team
7	D	Daryl Boyle	1.85 m (6 ft 1 in)	89 kg (196 lb)	24 February 1987	Sparwood, British Columbia, Canada	(Germany) EHC Red Bull München (DEL)
10	D	Christian Ehrhoff – A	1.88 m (6 ft 2 in)	92 kg (203 lb)	6 July 1982	Moers, West Germany	(Germany) Kölner Haie (DEL)
12	F	Brooks Macek	1.81 m (5 ft 11 in)	92 kg (203 lb)	15 May 1992	Winnipeg, Manitoba, Canada	(Germany) EHC Red Bull München (DEL)
17	F	Marcus Kink	1.86 m (6 ft 1 in)	96 kg (212 lb)	13 January 1985	Düsseldorf, West Germany	(Germany) Adler Mannheim (DEL)
22	F	Matthias Plachta	1.88 m (6 ft 2 in)	100 kg (220 lb)	16 May 1991	Freiburg im Breisgau	(Germany) Adler Mannheim (DEL)
28	F	Frank Mauer	1.84 m (6 ft 0 in)	90 kg (200 lb)	12 April 1988	Heidelberg, West Germany	(Germany) EHC Red Bull München (DEL)
33	G	Danny aus den Birken	1.86 m (6 ft 1 in)	89 kg (196 lb)	15 February 1985	Düsseldorf, West Germany	(Germany) EHC Red Bull München (DEL)
36	D	Yannic Seidenberg	1.71 m (5 ft 7 in)	82 kg (181 lb)	11 January 1984	Villingen-Schwenningen, West Germany	(Germany) EHC Red Bull München (DEL)
37	F	Patrick Reimer	1.79 m (5 ft 10 in)	86 kg (190 lb)	10 December 1982	Mindelheim, West Germany	(Germany) Thomas Sabo Ice Tigers (DEL)
40	D	Björn Krupp	1.91 m (6 ft 3 in)	95 kg (209 lb)	6 March 1991	Buffalo, New York, United States	(Germany) Grizzlys Wolfsburg (DEL)
41	D	Jonas Müller	1.83 m (6 ft 0 in)	88 kg (194 lb)	19 November 1995	Berlin	(Germany) Eisbären Berlin (DEL)
42	F	Yasin Ehliz	1.77 m (5 ft 10 in)	83 kg (183 lb)	30 December 1992	Bad Tölz	(Germany) Thomas Sabo Ice Tigers (DEL)
43	F	Gerrit Fauser	1.82 m (6 ft 0 in)	89 kg (196 lb)	13 July 1989	Nuremberg, West Germany	(Germany) Grizzlys Wolfsburg (DEL)
44	G	Dennis Endras	1.82 m (6 ft 0 in)	80 kg (180 lb)	14 July 1985	Immenstadt, West Germany	(Germany) Adler Mannheim (DEL)
48	D	Frank Hördler	1.83 m (6 ft 0 in)	90 kg (200 lb)	26 January 1985	Bad Muskau, East Germany	(Germany) Eisbären Berlin (DEL)
50	F	Patrick Hager – A	1.78 m (5 ft 10 in)	83 kg (183 lb)	8 September 1988	Stuttgart, West Germany	(Germany) EHC Red Bull München (DEL)
51	G	Timo Pielmeier	1.83 m (6 ft 0 in)	82 kg (181 lb)	7 July 1989	Deggendorf, West Germany	(Germany) ERC Ingolstadt (DEL)
55	F	Felix Schütz	1.81 m (5 ft 11 in)	89 kg (196 lb)	3 November 1987	Erding, West Germany	(Germany) Kölner Haie (DEL)
57	F	Marcel Goc – C	1.85 m (6 ft 1 in)	92 kg (203 lb)	24 August 1983	Calw, West Germany	(Germany) Adler Mannheim (DEL)
72	F	Dominik Kahun	1.80 m (5 ft 11 in)	78 kg (172 lb)	2 July 1995	Planá, Czech Republic	(Germany) EHC Red Bull München (DEL)
82	D	Sinan Akdag	1.88 m (6 ft 2 in)	89 kg (196 lb)	5 November 1989	Rosenheim, West Germany	(Germany) Adler Mannheim (DEL)
83	F	Leonhard Pföderl	1.82 m (6 ft 0 in)	87 kg (192 lb)	1 September 1993	Bad Tölz	(Germany) Thomas Sabo Ice Tigers (DEL)
89	F	David Wolf	1.91 m (6 ft 3 in)	99 kg (218 lb)	15 September 1989	Düsseldorf, West Germany	(Germany) Adler Mannheim (DEL)
91	D	Moritz Müller	1.87 m (6 ft 2 in)	92 kg (203 lb)	19 November 1986	Frankfurt, West Germany	(Germany) Kölner Haie (DEL)
92	F	Marcel Noebels	1.89 m (6 ft 2 in)	87 kg (192 lb)	14 March 1992	Tönisvorst	(Germany) Eisbären Berlin (DEL)

=== Norway ===
The following is the roster of the Norway national team for the men's ice hockey tournament at the 2018 Winter Olympics.

Head coach: (Norway) Petter Thoresen Assistant coach: (Norway) Sjur Robert Nilsen

No.	Pos.	Name	Height	Weight	Birthdate	Birthplace	2017–18 team
4	D	Johannes Johannesen	1.81 m (5 ft 11 in)	87 kg (192 lb)	1 March 1997	Stavanger	(Norway) Stavanger Oilers (GET-ligaen)
5	D	Erlend Lesund	1.90 m (6 ft 3 in)	93 kg (205 lb)	11 December 1994	Oslo	(Sweden) Mora IK (SHL)
6	D	Jonas Holøs – C	1.80 m (5 ft 11 in)	92 kg (203 lb)	27 August 1987	Sarpsborg	(Switzerland) HC Fribourg-Gottéron (NL)
8	F	Mathias Trettenes	1.80 m (5 ft 11 in)	82 kg (181 lb)	8 November 1993	Stavanger	(Norway) Stavanger Oilers (GET-ligaen)
10	D	Mattias Nørstebø	1.78 m (5 ft 10 in)	82 kg (181 lb)	3 June 1995	Trondheim	(Sweden) Frölunda HC (SHL)
15	F	Tommy Kristiansen	1.89 m (6 ft 2 in)	100 kg (220 lb)	26 May 1989	Sarpsborg	(Norway) Sparta Warriors (GET-ligaen)
16	F	Eirik Salsten	1.84 m (6 ft 0 in)	87 kg (192 lb)	17 June 1994	Oslo	(Norway) Stavanger Oilers (GET-ligaen)
17	D	Stefan Espeland	1.82 m (6 ft 0 in)	84 kg (185 lb)	24 March 1989	Oslo	(Norway) Vålerenga Ishockey (GET-ligaen)
20	F	Anders Bastiansen	1.90 m (6 ft 3 in)	95 kg (209 lb)	31 October 1980	Asker	(Norway) Frisk Asker (GET-ligaen)
21	F	Steffen Thoresen	1.80 m (5 ft 11 in)	90 kg (200 lb)	3 June 1985	Oslo	(Norway) Storhamar Ishockey (GET-ligaen)
22	F	Martin Røymark	1.84 m (6 ft 0 in)	87 kg (192 lb)	10 November 1986	Oslo	(Sweden) Modo Hockey (HA)
26	F	Kristian Forsberg	1.85 m (6 ft 1 in)	92 kg (203 lb)	5 May 1986	Oslo	(Norway) Stavanger Oilers (GET-ligaen)
27	F	Ludvig Hoff	1.80 m (5 ft 11 in)	87 kg (192 lb)	16 October 1996	Oslo	(United States) North Dakota Fighting Hawks (NCHC)
28	F	Niklas Roest	1.74 m (5 ft 9 in)	82 kg (181 lb)	3 August 1986	Oslo	(Norway) Sparta Warriors (GET-ligaen)
30	G	Lars Haugen	1.84 m (6 ft 0 in)	86 kg (190 lb)	19 March 1987	Oslo	(Sweden) Färjestad BK (SHL)
33	G	Henrik Haukeland	1.88 m (6 ft 2 in)	86 kg (190 lb)	6 December 1994	Fredrikstad	(Sweden) Timrå IK (HA)
38	G	Henrik Holm	1.86 m (6 ft 1 in)	84 kg (185 lb)	6 September 1990	Fredrikstad	(Norway) Stavanger Oilers (GET-ligaen)
40	F	Ken André Olimb	1.78 m (5 ft 10 in)	80 kg (180 lb)	21 January 1989	Oslo	(Sweden) Linköpings HC (SHL)
41	F	Patrick Thoresen – A	1.80 m (5 ft 11 in)	92 kg (203 lb)	7 November 1983	Oslo	(Russia) SKA Saint Petersburg (KHL)
42	D	Henrik Ødegaard	1.80 m (5 ft 11 in)	90 kg (200 lb)	12 February 1988	Asker	(Norway) Frisk Asker (GET-ligaen)
46	F	Mathis Olimb – A	1.78 m (5 ft 10 in)	80 kg (180 lb)	1 February 1986	Oslo	(Sweden) Linköpings HC (SHL)
47	D	Alexander Bonsaksen	1.80 m (5 ft 11 in)	85 kg (187 lb)	24 January 1987	Oslo	(Germany) Iserlohn Roosters (DEL)
51	F	Mats Rosseli Olsen	1.80 m (5 ft 11 in)	82 kg (181 lb)	29 April 1991	Oslo	(Sweden) Frölunda HC (SHL)
61	F	Aleksander Reichenberg	1.85 m (6 ft 1 in)	81 kg (179 lb)	13 June 1992	Mora, Sweden	(Czech Republic) HC Sparta Praha (ELH)
90	D	Daniel Sørvik	1.83 m (6 ft 0 in)	92 kg (203 lb)	11 March 1990	Oslo	(Czech Republic) HC Litvínov (ELH)

=== Sweden ===
The following is the Swedish roster for the men's ice hockey tournament at the 2018 Winter Olympics.

Head coach: (Sweden) Rikard Grönborg Assistant coaches: (Sweden) Johan Garpenlöv, (Sweden) Peter Popovic

No.	Pos.	Name	Height	Weight	Birthdate	Birthplace	2017–18 team
1	G	Jhonas Enroth	1.79 m (5 ft 10 in)	79 kg (174 lb)	25 June 1988	Stockholm	(Belarus) HC Dinamo Minsk (KHL)
4	D	Staffan Kronwall – A	1.95 m (6 ft 5 in)	102 kg (225 lb)	10 September 1982	Stockholm	(Russia) Lokomotiv Yaroslavl (KHL)
5	D	Mikael Wikstrand	1.86 m (6 ft 1 in)	95 kg (209 lb)	5 November 1993	Karlstad	(Sweden) Färjestad BK (SHL)
6	D	Patrik Hersley	1.91 m (6 ft 3 in)	95 kg (209 lb)	23 June 1986	Malmö	(Russia) SKA Saint Petersburg (KHL)
8	D	Johan Fransson	1.86 m (6 ft 1 in)	90 kg (200 lb)	18 February 1985	Kalix	(Switzerland) Genève-Servette HC (NL)
10	F	Joakim Lindström	1.85 m (6 ft 1 in)	87 kg (192 lb)	5 December 1983	Skellefteå	(Sweden) Skellefteå AIK (SHL)
12	F	Fredrik Pettersson	1.75 m (5 ft 9 in)	81 kg (179 lb)	10 June 1987	Gothenburg	(Switzerland) ZSC Lions (NL)
15	D	Simon Bertilsson	1.83 m (6 ft 0 in)	90 kg (200 lb)	19 April 1991	Karlskoga	(Sweden) Brynäs IF (SHL)
17	F	Pär Lindholm	1.81 m (5 ft 11 in)	85 kg (187 lb)	5 October 1991	Skellefteå	(Sweden) Skellefteå AIK (SHL)
18	F	Dennis Everberg	1.93 m (6 ft 4 in)	93 kg (205 lb)	31 December 1991	Västerås	(Russia) HC Neftekhimik Nizhnekamsk (KHL)
19	F	Patrik Zackrisson	1.80 m (5 ft 11 in)	85 kg (187 lb)	27 March 1987	Ekerö	(Russia) HC Sibir Novosibirsk (KHL)
20	F	Joel Lundqvist – C	1.83 m (6 ft 0 in)	90 kg (200 lb)	2 March 1982	Åre	(Sweden) Frölunda HC (SHL)
22	F	Alexander Bergström	1.90 m (6 ft 3 in)	87 kg (192 lb)	18 January 1986	Osby	(Russia) HC Sibir Novosibirsk (KHL)
25	F	Viktor Stålberg	1.89 m (6 ft 2 in)	94 kg (207 lb)	17 January 1986	Gothenburg	(Switzerland) EV Zug (NL)
26	D	Rasmus Dahlin	1.89 m (6 ft 2 in)	85 kg (187 lb)	13 April 2000	Trollhättan	(Sweden) Frölunda HC (SHL)
28	F	Dick Axelsson	1.91 m (6 ft 3 in)	93 kg (205 lb)	25 April 1987	Stockholm	(Sweden) Färjestad BK (SHL)
29	D	Erik Gustafsson – A	1.79 m (5 ft 10 in)	90 kg (200 lb)	15 December 1988	Sundsvall	(Russia) HC Neftekhimik Nizhnekamsk (KHL)
30	G	Viktor Fasth	1.83 m (6 ft 0 in)	86 kg (190 lb)	8 August 1982	Kalix	(Sweden) Växjö Lakers (SHL)
35	G	Magnus Hellberg	1.96 m (6 ft 5 in)	93 kg (205 lb)	4 April 1991	Uppsala	(China) Kunlun Red Star (KHL)
37	F	John Norman	1.80 m (5 ft 11 in)	85 kg (187 lb)	6 January 1991	Stockholm	(Finland) Jokerit (KHL)
45	F	Oscar Möller	1.78 m (5 ft 10 in)	82 kg (181 lb)	22 January 1989	Stockholm	(Sweden) Skellefteå AIK (SHL)
48	F	Carl Klingberg	1.90 m (6 ft 3 in)	98 kg (216 lb)	28 January 1991	Gothenburg	(Switzerland) EV Zug (NL)
51	D	Jonas Ahnelöv	1.88 m (6 ft 2 in)	95 kg (209 lb)	11 December 1987	Stockholm	(Russia) Avangard Omsk (KHL)
58	F	Anton Lander	1.83 cm (0.72 in)	84 kg (185 lb)	24 April 1991	Sundsvall	(Russia) Ak Bars Kazan (KHL)
67	F	Linus Omark	1.79 m (5 ft 10 in)	82 kg (181 lb)	5 February 1987	Övertorneå	(Russia) Salavat Yulaev Ufa (KHL)

== See also ==
- Ice hockey at the 2018 Winter Olympics – Women's team rosters
