= Vitali Kolesnik =

Kazakhstani ice hockey player

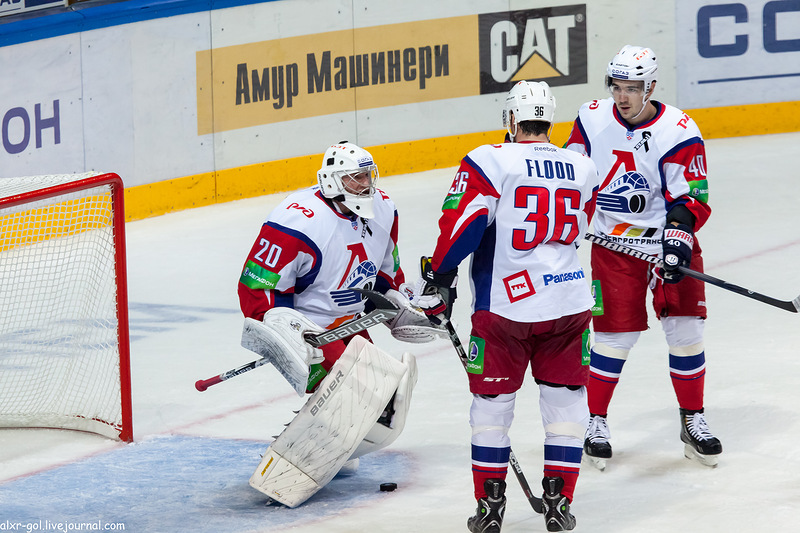
- Kolesnik (left) reprimanding Mark Flood (centre)
- Born: August 20, 1979 (age 46) Ust-Kamenogorsk, Kazakh SSR, Soviet Union
- Height: 6 ft 3 in (191 cm)
- Weight: 207 lb (94 kg; 14 st 11 lb)
- Position: Goaltender
- Caught: Left
- Played for: Kazzinc-Torpedo; Colorado Avalanche; Khimik/Atlant Mytishchi; Salavat Yulaev Ufa; Lokomotiv Yaroslavl; Barys Astana
- National team: Kazakhstan
- NHL draft: Undrafted
- Playing career: 1998–2017

Medal record

Men's ice hockey

Representing Kazakhstan

Asian Games
| Gold medal – first place | 2011 Astana-Almaty | Ice hockey |

Vitali Nikolaevich Kolesnik (Russian: Виталий Николаевич Коле́сник; born August 20, 1979) is a Kazakhstani former professional ice hockey goaltender, who played in the National Hockey League (NHL) with the Colorado Avalanche and the Kontinental Hockey League (KHL).

== Playing career ==
Kolesnik began his career with Kazzinc-Torpedo and spent five years with the club from Ust-Kamenogorsk before being signed as a free agent by the Colorado Avalanche on August 16, 2005. Unlike the vast majority of NHL players, Kolesnik was never drafted.

He played for the Avalanche's minor league hockey team, the Lowell Lock Monsters, where he logged a 2.80 goals against average (GAA) and a .916 save percentage with a pair of shutouts. His first game played with the Colorado Avalanche was on December 7, 2005, in which they beat the Boston Bruins 4–1. On December 28, 2005, the Colorado Avalanche announced that Kolesnik was being sent back to Lowell, after starting seven NHL games, going 3–3–0, with a 3.29 goals against average and a .887 save percentage. Earlier in the week, on December 21, it was announced that Kolesnik was selected to represent his home country of Kazakhstan in the 2006 Winter Olympics in Turin, Italy. He got to play in two games (4–1 loss to USA, 2–1 loss to Slovakia), and was the first star for Kazakhstan in both games.

Kolesnik was recalled again by the Avalanche on March 9, 2006 to dress as a backup to Peter Budaj. Kolesnik finished the season with Colorado, appearing in eight games.

For the 2006–07 season, Kolesnik, with the ambition to become a starting goaltender, left North America to play for Khimik Mytishchi in the Russian Superleague (RSL). On April 28, 2009, he left Mytishi Khimik and signed with league rival Avangard Omsk. After only three months with Avangard, Kolesnik joined Salavat Yulaev Ufa and signed a three-year contract. He finished the first regular season of the KHL with the lowest goals against average amongst all goaltenders with 1.59. During the opening round playoffs in the 2009–10 season against Avtomobilist, Kolesnik became the victim of a bizarre random assault when an inebriated Ekaterinburg fan from the stands swung a stick repeatedly over the Ufa team bench and concussed Kolesnik. Kolesnik left the game as Avtomobilist won 4–3 and were subsequently fined. He went on to win the Gagarin Cup with Salavat Yulavev Ufa during the 2010–11 season.

After the completion of his three-year contract, Kolesnik left to sign as a free agent with the rebuilt Lokomotiv Yaroslavl, for the 2012–13 season on May 3, 2012. Kolesnik played his last season with Barys Astana in 2016-2017 before retiring.

== Career statistics ==
=== Regular season and playoffs ===
| | | | Regular season | | | | | | | | | Playoffs |
| Season | Team | League | GP | W | L | T/OT | MIN | GA | SO | GAA | SV% | GP | W | L | MIN | GA | SO | GAA | SV% |
|---|---|---|---|---|---|---|---|---|---|---|---|---|---|---|---|---|---|---|---|
| 1998–99 | Kazzinc-Torpedo | VHL | 2 | — | — | — | — | — | — | — | — | — | — | — | — | — | — | — | — |
| 2001–02 | Kazzinc-Torpedo | VHL | 1 | — | — | — | — | — | — | 1.00 | — | — | — | — | — | — | — | — | — |
| 2002–03 | Kazzinc-Torpedo | VHL | 25 | — | — | — | — | — | — | 2.10 | — | — | — | — | — | — | — | — | — |
| 2003–04 | Kazzinc-Torpedo | VHL | 35 | — | — | — | — | — | — | 1.67 | — | — | — | — | — | — | — | — | — |
| 2004–05 | Kazzinc-Torpedo | VHL | 42 | — | — | — | — | — | — | 1.67 | — | — | — | — | — | — | — | — | — |
| 2005–06 | Lowell Lock Monsters | AHL | 29 | 15 | 13 | 0 | 1717 | 80 | 3 | 2.80 | .918 | — | — | — | — | — | — | — | — |
| 2005–06 | Colorado Avalanche | NHL | 8 | 3 | 3 | 0 | 370 | 20 | 0 | 3.24 | .888 | — | — | — | — | — | — | — | — |
| 2006–07 | Khimik Moscow Oblast | RSL | 38 | — | — | — | 2006 | 82 | 4 | 2.45 | — | 9 | — | — | 503 | 16 | 3 | 1.91 | — |
| 2007–08 | Khimik Moscow Oblast | RSL | 51 | — | — | — | 2684 | 101 | 3 | 2.26 | — | 5 | — | — | 269 | 10 | 0 | 2.23 | — |
| 2008–09 | Atlant Moscow Oblast | KHL | 30 | 15 | 5 | 6 | 1322 | 35 | 5 | 1.59 | .945 | 1 | 0 | 0 | 7 | 0 | 0 | 0.00 | 1.000 |
| 2009–10 | Salavat Yulaev Ufa | KHL | 34 | 17 | 6 | 6 | 1622 | 60 | 5 | 2.22 | .908 | 4 | 1 | 3 | 272 | 8 | 0 | 1.76 | .934 |
| 2010–11 | Salavat Yulaev Ufa | KHL | 27 | 15 | 4 | 5 | 1315 | 50 | 3 | 2.28 | .922 | 4 | 1 | 2 | 148 | 2 | 1 | 0.81 | .975 |
| 2011–12 | Salavat Yulaev Ufa | KHL | 20 | 6 | 8 | 3 | 1016 | 53 | 1 | 3.13 | .898 | — | — | — | — | — | — | — | — |
| 2012–13 | Lokomotiv Yaroslavl | KHL | 15 | 6 | 7 | 2 | 830 | 34 | 2 | 2.46 | .920 | — | — | — | — | — | — | — | — |
| 2013–14 | Lokomotiv Yaroslavl | KHL | 19 | 7 | 4 | 5 | 955 | 24 | 3 | 1.51 | .946 | 1 | 0 | 0 | 20 | 1 | 0 | 3.00 | .917 |
| 2014–15 | Lokomotiv Yaroslavl | KHL | 28 | 13 | 6 | 7 | 1456 | 44 | 1 | 1.81 | .932 | 3 | 0 | 2 | 139 | 8 | 0 | 3.47 | .881 |
| 2015–16 | Lokomotiv Yaroslavl | KHL | 26 | 15 | 7 | 3 | 1506 | 50 | 2 | 1.99 | .919 | — | — | — | — | — | — | — | — |
| 2016–17 | Barys Astana | KHL | 6 | 0 | 3 | 0 | 230 | 16 | 0 | 4.17 | .855 | — | — | — | — | — | — | — | — |
| KHL totals | | | 205 | 93 | 48 | 37 | 10,253 | 366 | 22 | 2.14 | .922 | 13 | 2 | 6 | 586 | 19 | 1 | 1.94 | .933 |
| NHL totals | | | 8 | 3 | 3 | 0 | 370 | 20 | 0 | 3.24 | .888 | — | — | — | — | — | — | — | — |
