= Alexei Antsiferov =

Kazakhstani-Russian ice hockey player

- Born: March 4, 1991 (age 34); Novosibirsk, Russia
- Height: 6 ft 1 in (185 cm)
- Weight: 176 lb (80 kg; 12 st 8 lb)
- Position: Forward
- Shoots: Right
- KHL team (P) Cur. team: Barys Astana; Nomad Astana (KAZ)
- National team: Kazakhstan
- NHL draft: Undrafted
- Playing career: 2009–present

Alexei Alexandrovich Antsiferov (Russian: Алексей Александрович Анциферов; born March 4, 1991) a Kazakhstani-Russian professional ice hockey forward who currently plays for Barys Astana of the Kontinental Hockey League (KHL).

== Career statistics ==
=== International ===
Year	Team	Event	GP	G	A	Pts	PIM
2014	Kazakhstan	WC	1	0	0	0	0
Senior int'l totals			1	0	0	0	0
