= Takuro Yamashita =

Japanese ice hockey player

- Born: May 22, 1988 (age 37) Kushiro, Japan
- Height: 5 ft 11 in (180 cm)
- Weight: 176 lb (80 kg; 12 st 8 lb)
- Position: Forward
- Shoots: Right
- ALIH team: Tohoku Free Blades
- National team: Japan
- Playing career: 2012–present

Takuro Yamashita (山下拓郎; born May 22, 1988) is a Japanese professional ice hockey forward currently playing for the Tohoku Free Blades of the Asia League.

Since 2011 he plays for the Tohoku Free Blades. He previously played at amateur level for the Komazawa Tomakomai team and for the Waseda University. He also plays in the senior Japan national team since 2012 until now.
