= Ilgiz Nuriyev =

Russian ice hockey player

- Born: 21 January 1984 (age 41); Surgut, RUS
- Height: 1.82 m (6 ft 0 in)
- Weight: 82 kg (181 lb; 12 st 13 lb)
- Position: Forward
- Shoots: Left
- KAZ team: Arystan Temirtau
- Playing career: 1999–present

Ilgiz Nuriyev (born 21 January 1984 in Surgut) is a Russian professional ice hockey player who currently plays for Arystan Temirtau in the Kazakhstan Hockey Championship league.
