= Park Woo-sang =

South Korean ice hockey player

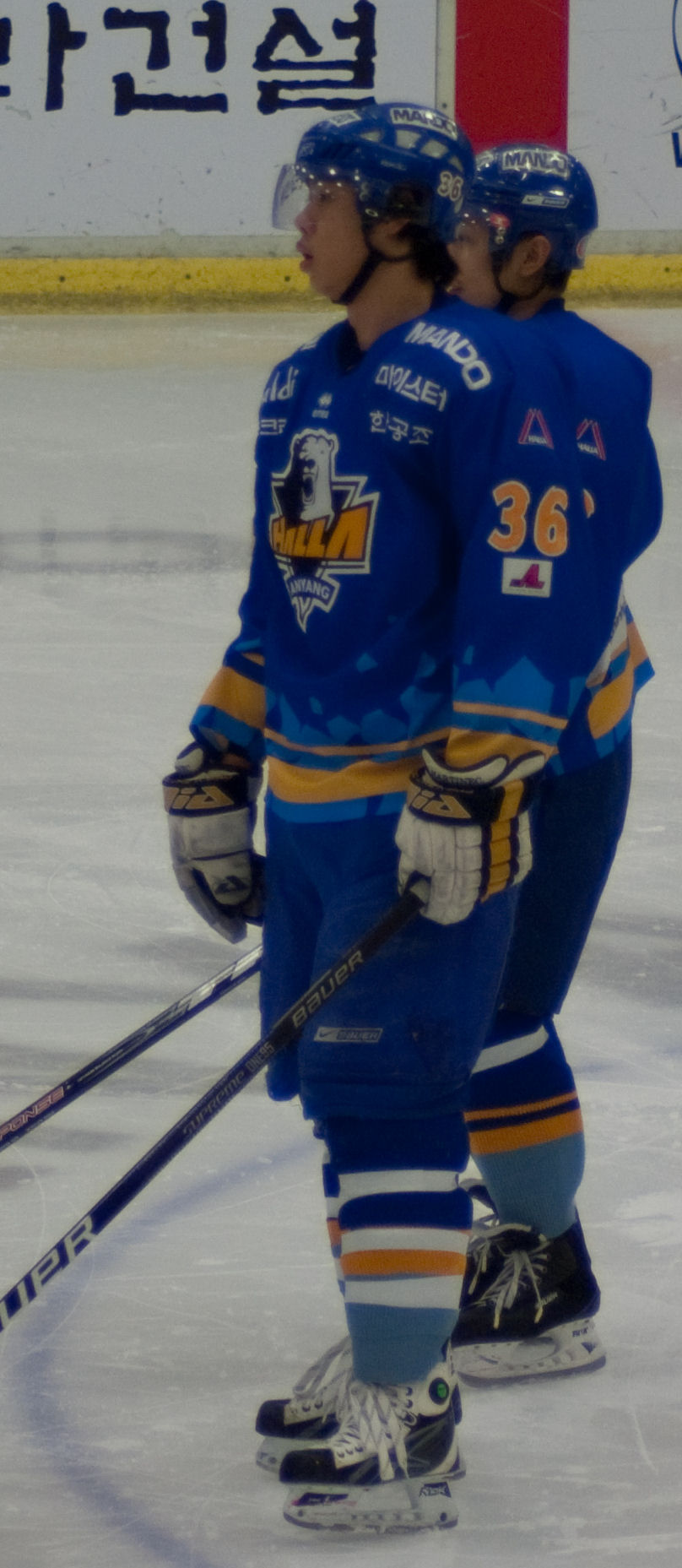
- Born: May 30, 1985 (age 40) Seoul, South Korea
- Height: 6 ft 3 in (191 cm)
- Weight: 212 lb (96 kg; 15 st 2 lb)
- Position: Center
- Shot: Right
- ALIH team Former teams: Anyang Halla; Coventry Blaze
- National team: South Korea
- Playing career: 2008–2019

Park Woo-sang
Medal record

Men's ice hockey

Representing South Korea

Asian Games
Silver medal – second place	2017 Sapporo	Ice hockey
Bronze medal – third place	2007 Changchun	Ice hockey
Bronze medal – third place	2011 Astana-Almaty	Ice hockey

Park Woo-sang (Korean: 박우상; born May 30, 1985, in Seoul) is a retired South Korean professional ice hockey center. He played for the South Korean national team at the 2007 Asian Winter Games, and scored 4 goals. He played three seasons for Anyang Halla of ALH. On November 1, 2011, Park signed a 1-year deal with the Coventry Blaze of the EIHL, becoming the first Korean native to play in the British league.
