= Konstantin Savenkov =

Kazakhstani ice hockey player

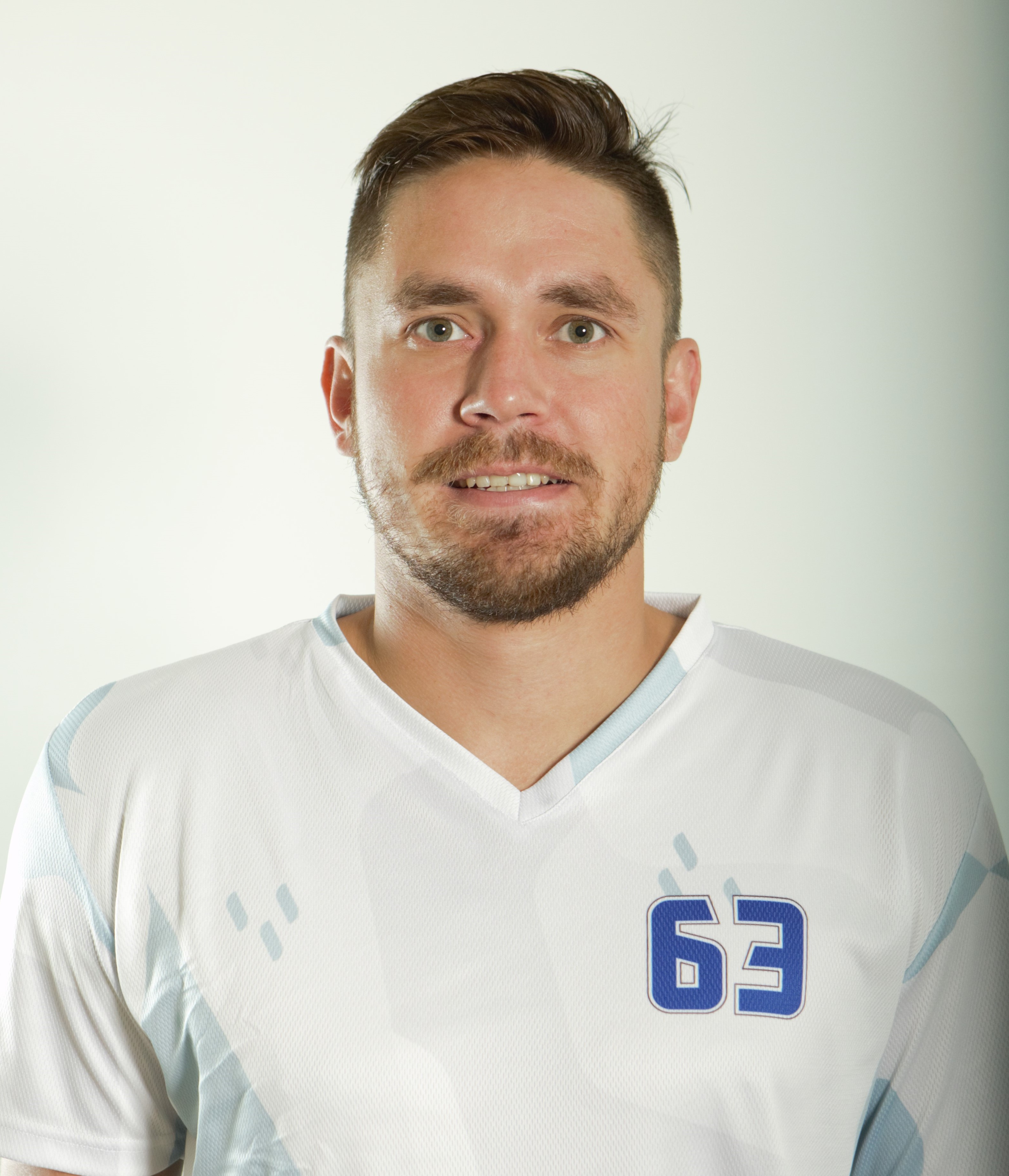
- Born: March 25, 1990 (age 36) Ust-Kamenogorsk, Kazakh SSR, Soviet Union
- Height: 6 ft 0 in (183 cm)
- Weight: 174 lb (79 kg; 12 st 6 lb)
- Position: Left wing
- Shoots: Left
- VHL team Former teams: Kazzinc-Torpedo; Barys Astana
- National team: Kazakhstan
- NHL draft: Undrafted
- Playing career: 2008–present

Konstantin Sergeyevich Savenkov (Russian: Константин Сергеевич Савенков; born March 25, 1990) is a Kazakhstani professional ice hockey forward currently playing for the Kazzinc-Torpedo of the VHL. He was a member of the Kazakhstan men's national ice hockey team during the 2012 IIHF World Championship.

== Career statistics ==
=== Regular season and playoffs ===
			Regular season						Playoffs
Season	Team	League	GP	G	A	Pts	+/−	PIM	GP	G	A	Pts	+/−	PIM
2010-11	Kazzinc-Torpedo	VHL	49	6	10	16	+5	26	5	2	2	4	+3	31
2011-12	Kazzinc-Torpedo	VHL	52	11	12	23	+3	48	5	3	0	3	-1	6
2012-13	Kazzinc-Torpedo	VHL	38	5	12	17	+7	38	—	—	—	—	—	—
2012-13	Barys Astana	KHL	3	0	1	1	-2	0	—	—	—	—	—	—
VHL totals			165	29	43	72	+15	120	10	5	2	7	+2	37
KHL totals			3	0	1	1	-2	0	—	—	—	—	—	—

=== International ===
Year	Team	Event	GP	G	A	Pts	+/−	PIM
2008	Kazakhstan Jr.	WJC	6	1	1	2	-4	0
2009	Kazakhstan Jr.	WJC	6	3	0	3	-8	8
2012	Kazakhstan	WC	3	0	0	0	0	2
Junior int'l totals			12	4	1	5	-12	8
Senior int'l totals			3	0	0	0	0	2
