= Mikaho Gymnasium =

Indoor sporting arena in Sapporo, Japan

Coordinates: 43.089368°N 141.357087°E

Sapporo Mikaho Gymnasium
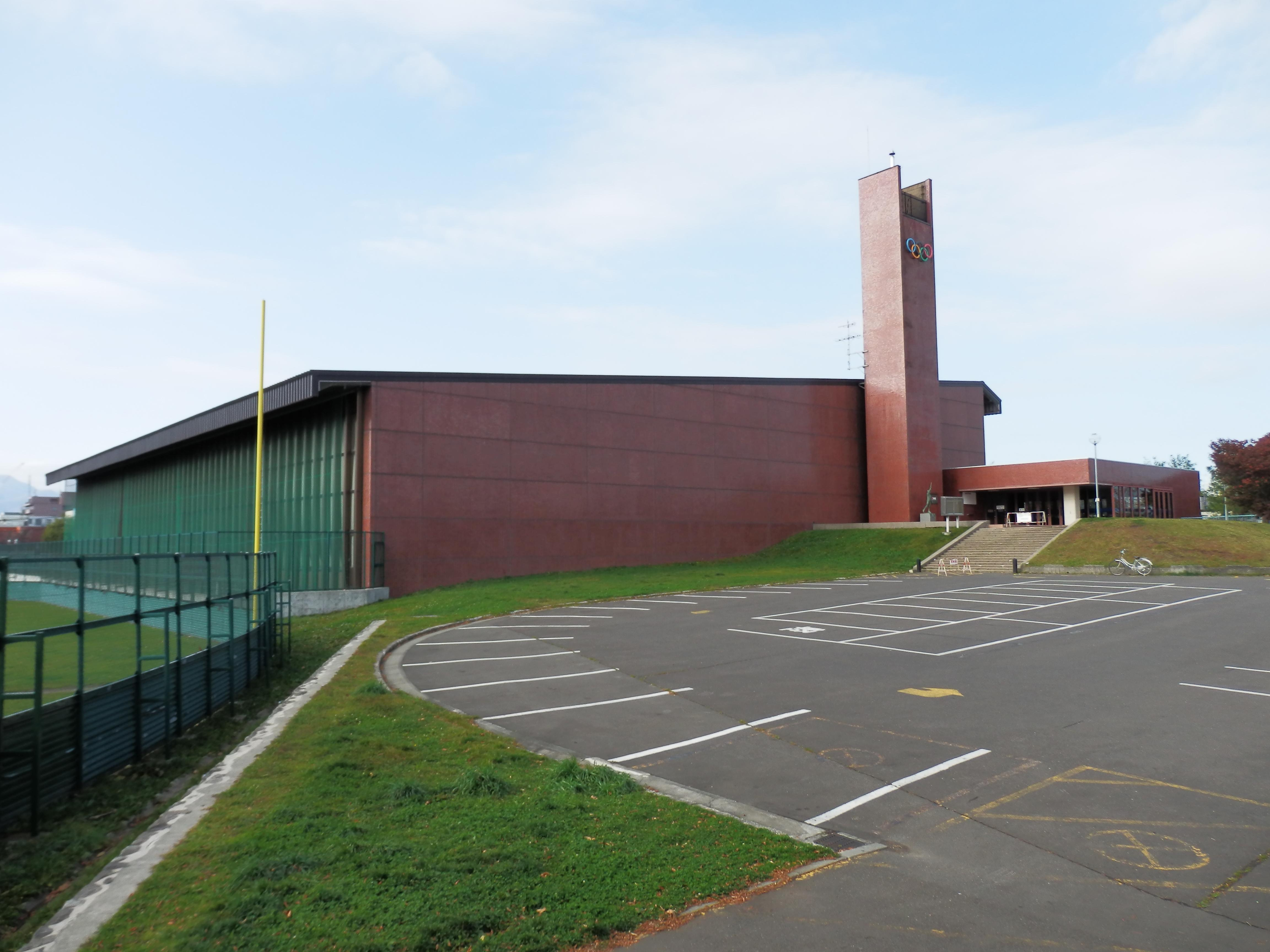
- Interactive map of Sapporo Mikaho Gymnasium
- Location: Sapporo, Japan
- Owner: Sapporo City
- Operator: Sapporo Health Sports Foundation

Construction
- Opened: 1970

The Sapporo Mikaho Gymnasium (札幌市美香保体育館, Sapporo-shi Mikaho Taiikukan) is an indoor sporting arena in Higashi-ku, Sapporo, Hokkaido, Japan.

It was built in October 1970, and has an area of 6,267 m^{2} in total. Mikaho Gymnasium was one of the venues for figure skating at the 11th Winter Olympic Games held in Sapporo in February 1972.

The gym is currently used as a skating rink in winter (for figure skating, leisure skating and curling), and as a gym in the summer months. After the Olympics, it was briefly used as a heated swimming pool in the summer.

It is located next to three baseball diamonds, and four tennis courts.

== Access ==
The gymnasium is 10 minutes' walk from Kita-Nijūyo-Jō Station on the Namboku Line.
