= Maxim Volkov =

Kazakhstani ice hockey player

- Born: 16 January 1985 (age 41) Karaganda, KAZ
- Height: 1.75 m (5 ft 9 in)
- Weight: 73 kg (161 lb; 11 st 7 lb)
- Position: Forward
- KAZ team: Arystan Temirtau
- Playing career: 2002–present

Maxim Volkov (Максим Андреевич Волков, born 16 January 1985, in Karaganda) is a Kazakhstani professional ice hockey player currently playing for Arystan Temirtau in the Kazakhstan Hockey Championship league.
