= Park Jin-kyu =

South Korean ice hockey player

- Born: 18 December 1991 (age 33); South Korea
- Height: 175 cm (5 ft 9 in)
- Weight: 83 kg (183 lb; 13 st 1 lb)
- Position: Forward
- Shoots: Left
- ALIH team Former teams: Anyang Halla; Sangmu
- National team: South Korea
- Playing career: 2014–present

Park Jin-kyu (born 18 December 1991) is a South Korean ice hockey forward who currently plays for Anyang Halla of Asia League Ice Hockey. He competed at the 2018 Winter Olympics.
