= Park Kye-hoon =

South Korean ice hockey player

- Born: 9 February 1992 (age 33); Gyeongsang, South Korea
- Height: 184 cm (6 ft 0 in)
- Weight: 83 kg (183 lb; 13 st 1 lb)
- Position: Goaltender
- Catches: Right
- ALIH team Former teams: Daemyung Killer Whales; High1
- National team: South Korea
- Playing career: 2015–present

Park Kye-hoon (born 9 February 1992 in Gyeongsang) is a South Korean ice hockey goaltender currently playing for the Daemyung Killer Whales of Asia League Ice Hockey. He competed in the 2018 Winter Olympics.
