= Brock Radunske =

Canadian-born South Korean ice hockey player (born 1983)

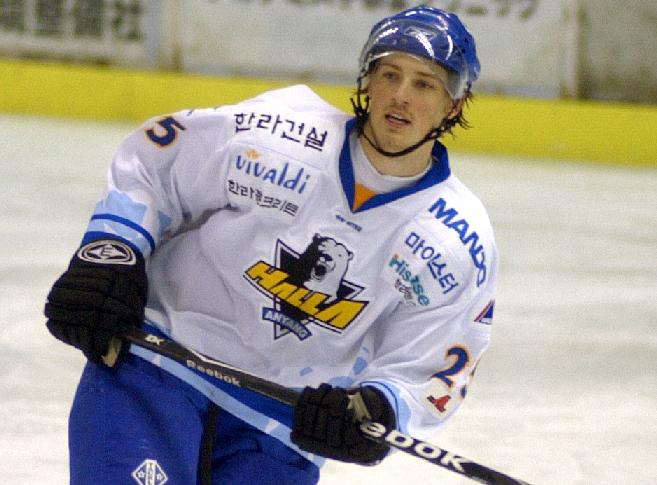
- Born: April 5, 1983 (age 43) Kitchener, Ontario, Canada
- Height: 6 ft 5 in (196 cm)
- Weight: 210 lb (95 kg; 15 st 0 lb)
- Position: Centre/Left wing
- Shot: Left
- Played for: Edmonton Road Runners; Grand Rapids Griffins; HC Davos; Augsburger Panther; Anyang Halla
- National team: South Korea
- NHL draft: 79th overall, 2002; Edmonton Oilers
- Playing career: 2000–2018

Brock Radunske (born April 5, 1983) is a Canadian-born South Korean former professional ice hockey forward. He was selected in the third round of the 2002 NHL entry draft, 79th overall, by the Edmonton Oilers.

Enrolled as a communications major, in Michigan State University, he spent three seasons playing for the Michigan State Spartans. While at Michigan State he participated in the Cold War, an outdoor game between Michigan State and the University of Michigan.

Radunske became the first North American born player ever to sign with Anyang Halla and tallest forward in club's history. While playing for Anyang Halla, he earned the nickname "Canadian Big Beauty" (빙판의 꽃미남) from Korean fans because of his looks. He became eligible to play for the South Korean national team when granted citizenship in 2013, the first player without Korean ancestry to play on the team.

== Professional career ==
Radunske made his professional debut with Edmonton (AHL) on 18 October 2004 against San Antonio and scored his first professional goal on 23 October 2004 at Manitoba. In 2005–06, he was part of the Greenville team that advanced to an American Conference division semifinal playoff berth with a 45–24–3 regular season record (93 points), scoring his first goal of the season with Grand Rapids (AHL) on 14 November 2006 vs. Milwaukee. He followed up three games later with the game's first goal on 1 December 2006 vs. Rochester. He scored his first goal in a Thunder uniform on 4 March 2007, part of a two-goal output. He scored a career-high and tied a Thunder all-time single-game record with four points (1g-3a) on 9 March 2007 vs. Victoria, in a 5–4 shootout win. He broke a Thunder single-game record with a new career-high five points (2g-3a) on 22 March 2007, in a 6–3 win at Utah. He spent the 2007–08' season with Augsburger Panther (DEL), appeared in 37 games and scoring seven goals and 19 assists, for a total of 26 points.

=== Career in Asia ===
In May 2008, Radunske signed a one-year deal with Anyang Halla, earning his first point on Brad Fast's goal on 20 September 2008 vs High1 in Goyang. He scored his first goal for Halla on 21 September 2008 vs High1 with 51 seconds in the game. Radunske scored his first goal in home building on 29 September 2008 vs Oji Eagles and scored his first hat trick on 18 January 2009 vs Seibu Prince Rabbits.

After leading the league with goals & points, Radunske was awarded four trophies including regular season MVP, the Best-forward, best scorer & best point. In February 2009 Radunske re-signed with Anyang Halla for a three-year deal. Radunske's three-year deal is the longest contract extension in the club's history including all imports among Korean pro-sports league.

Radunske captured his first ever championship title, beating Nippon Paper Cranes series of 3–2 in the 2009–10 Asia League final. Radunske was named playoffs MVP.

As of the 2013–14 season, he's team all-time leader with most Goals scored and Points accumulated. Radunske officially retired after 2017–2018 season.

== International career ==
In March 2013 Radunske became a Korean citizen and was eligible to play for the South Korean national team. He was named to the team for the 2013 World Championships Division IA tournament. Radunske became the first member of the South Korean national team to not have Korean ancestry. His debut in the Korean national team was a success as he won the Team MVP for the tournament. He also played for Team Korea for 2018 Winter Olympics in Pyeongchang.

== Career statistics ==
=== Regular season and playoffs ===
			Regular season					Playoffs
Season	Team	League	GP	G	A	Pts	PIM	GP	G	A	Pts	PIM
1999–2000	Aurora Tigers	OPJHL	42	6	14	20	23	4	4	8	12	2
2000–01	Newmarket Hurricanes	OPJHL	49	30	39	69	65	—	—	—	—	—
2001–02	Michigan State University	CCHA	41	4	9	13	28	—	—	—	—	—
2002–03	Michigan State University	CCHA	36	11	18	29	30	—	—	—	—	—
2003–04	Michigan State University	CCHA	42	12	10	22	60	—	—	—	—	—
2004–05	Edmonton Roadrunners	AHL	8	1	1	2	2	—	—	—	—	—
2004–05	Greenville Grrrowl	ECHL	39	12	17	29	52	—	—	—	—	—
2005–06	Greenville Grrrowl	ECHL	63	38	16	54	58	6	1	2	3	14
2006–07	Grand Rapids Griffins	AHL	20	2	0	2	12	—	—	—	—	—
2006–07	Stockton Thunder	ECHL	16	14	19	33	12	3	0	0	0	2
2007–08	Augsburger Panther	DEL	37	7	19	26	59	—	—	—	—	—
2008–09	Anyang Halla	ALH	35	29	28	57	36	7	5	6	11	8
2009–10	Anyang Halla	ALH	28	19	29	48	24	9	6	7	13	12
2010–11	Anyang Halla	ALH	36	20	13	33	28	4	1	1	2	4
2011–12	Anyang Halla	ALH	36	22	30	52	26	5	2	4	6	4
2012–13	Anyang Halla	ALH	41	23	53	76	46	3	1	3	4	16
2013–14	Anyang Halla	ALH	40	29	36	65	73	—	—	—	—	—
2014–15	Anyang Halla	ALH	46	16	56	72	75	6	1	5	6	0
2015–16	Anyang Halla	ALH	42	25	25	50	34	8	2	1	3	18
2016–17	Anyang Halla	ALH	25	7	14	21	14	—	—	—	—	—
2017–18	Anyang Halla	ALH	23	5	6	11	14	7	3	1	4	2
ALH totals			352	195	290	485	370	49	21	28	49	64

=== International ===
Year	Team	Event	GP	G	A	Pts	PIM
2013	South Korea	WC D1A	5	3	2	5	2
2014	South Korea	WC D1A	5	3	3	6	10
2015	South Korea	WC D1B	5	0	7	7	0
2016	South Korea	WC D1A	5	0	0	0	4
2018	South Korea	OG	4	1	1	2	4
2018	South Korea	WC	7	1	1	2	12
Senior totals			31	8	14	22	32

== Career highlights and awards ==
- Asia League Ice Hockey Awards

2017–18 ALH season:

- Asia League Champion

2016–17 ALH season:

- Asia League Champion

2015–16 ALH season:

- Asia League Champion

2014–15 ALH season:

- Asia League 'Best-Forward' of the Year
- Asia League Most Assists (56)

2012–13 ALH season:

- Asia League Best Six

2010–11 ALH season:

- Asia League Champion

2009–10 ALH season:

- Asia League Champion
- Asia League Playoffs MVP

2008–09 ALH season:

- Asia League 'Best-Forward' of the Year
- Asia League 'MVP' of the year (Regular Season)
- Asia League Most Goals (29)
- Asia League Most Points (57)

== Records ==
Anyang Halla

- Team all-time leader for Most Points
- Team all-time leader for Most Goals
- Team all-time leader for Most Assists
- First player in team history to score 100 goals
- First player in team history to accumulate 300 points
- First player in team history to accumulate 400 points

== Personal life ==
Radunske was born in Kitchener, Ontario, but grew up in the town of New Hamburg. Nicknamed "Brocko" since he was a youngster. He is married to his wife, Kelly, with whom he has a daughter and a son.
