= Dustin Wood =

Canadian ice hockey player

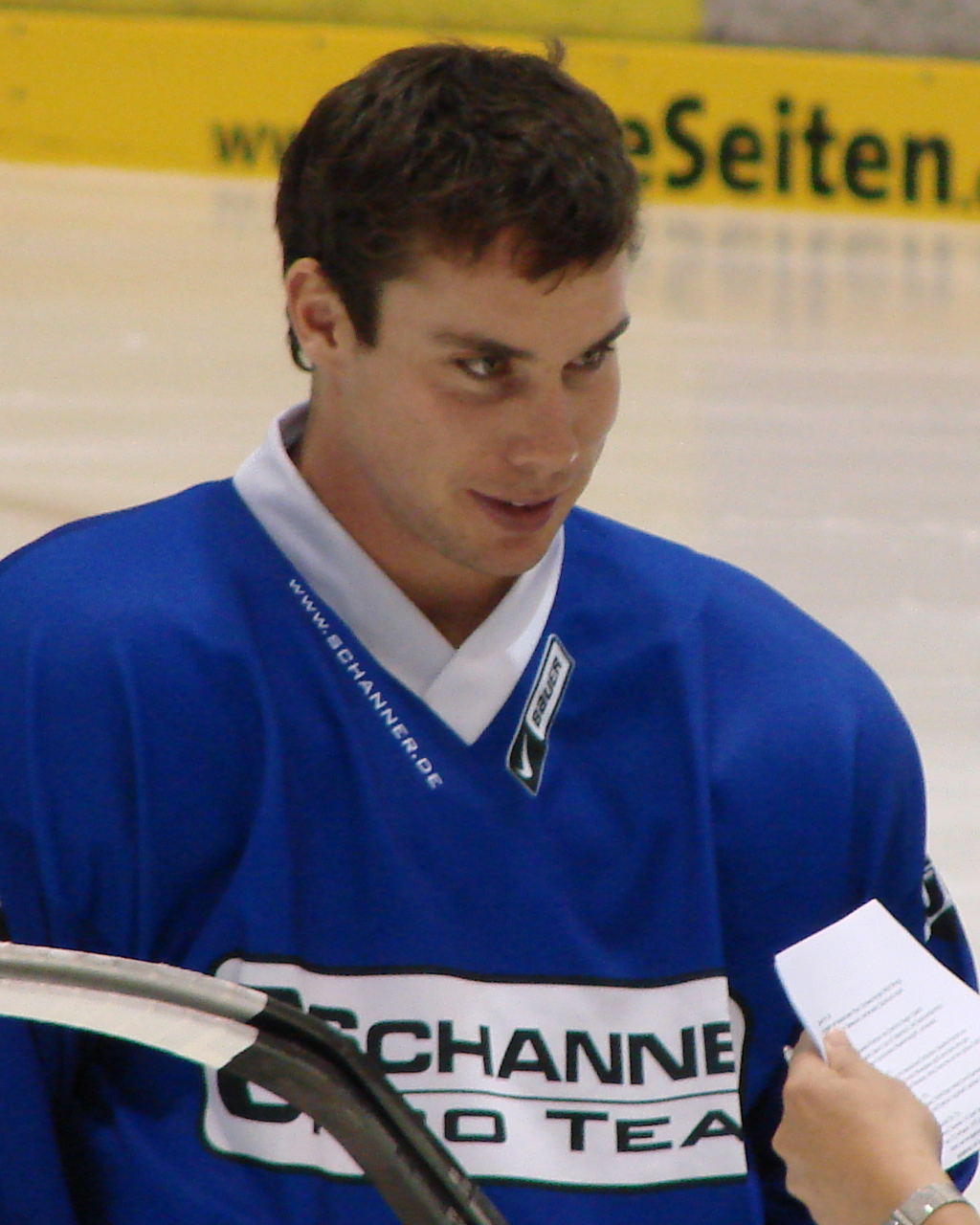
- Born: May 21, 1981 (age 44) Scarborough, Ontario, Canada
- Height: 6 ft 1 in (185 cm)
- Weight: 207 lb (94 kg; 14 st 11 lb)
- Position: Defenceman
- Shot: Left
- Played for: AHL; Bridgeport Sound Tigers; Springfield Falcons; Utah Grizzlies; Houston Aeros; Syracuse Crunch; Manitoba Moose; DEL; ERC Ingolstadt; Kassel Huskies; ALH; Anyang Halla; EIHL; Coventry Blaze; KHC; Arystan Temirtau; Arlan Kokshetau
- NHL draft: Undrafted
- Playing career: 2002–2017

Dustin Wood (born May 21, 1981, in Scarborough, Ontario) is a Canadian former professional ice hockey defenceman.

== Playing career ==
He spent his amateur career in the Ontario Hockey League with the Peterborough Petes. Wood made his professional debut in the 2002–03 season with the Trenton Titans of the East Coast Hockey League. After a five-year career in the American Hockey League, Wood signed with German team, ERC Ingolstadt of the DEL for the 2007-08 season.

After helping Ingolstadt reach the playoffs, Wood then signed with fellow DEL team, the Kassel Huskies for the 2008–09 season. In October 2009, Wood signed with Anyang Halla (Asia League) for a 3-month deal to fill Jon Awe's spot. On December 16, 2009 the club extended Wood's contract for the rest of the season. In May 2010, Anyang Halla re-signed Wood to a one-year deal.

October 2, 2011 He was announced as signing for the Coventry Blaze of the British EIHL, to replace John Gordon who was released from the squad.

In August 2013, he returned to Japan and signed for another stint with Anyang Halla on a one-year contract. In August 2014, Wood left the Asia League and signed with Arystan Temirtau, a team in the Kazakhstan top tier league for the 2013–14 season. He had previously played for the team during the 2012–13 season.

== Career statistics ==
			Regular season					Playoffs
Season	Team	League	GP	G	A	Pts	PIM	GP	G	A	Pts	PIM
1998–99	Peterborough Petes	OHL	62	1	8	9	14	5	0	0	0	0
1999–00	Peterborough Petes	OHL	66	2	13	15	29	5	0	1	1	0
2000–01	Peterborough Petes	OHL	64	5	20	25	41	7	0	3	3	11
2001–02	Peterborough Petes	OHL	68	13	38	51	57	6	2	1	3	4
2002–03	Trenton Titans	ECHL	63	4	23	27	28	3	0	1	1	2
2002–03	Bridgeport Sound Tigers	AHL	6	0	0	0	2	—	—	—	—	—
2003–04	Adirondack IceHawks	UHL	1	0	0	0	0	—	—	—	—	—
2003–04	Springfield Falcons	AHL	75	2	6	8	22	—	—	—	—	—
2004–05	Utah Grizzlies	AHL	80	2	8	10	39	—	—	—	—	—
2005–06	Houston Aeros	AHL	64	1	6	7	48	—	—	—	—	—
2005–06	Syracuse Crunch	AHL	14	0	3	3	14	6	0	0	0	8
2006–07	Manitoba Moose	AHL	62	4	12	16	36	13	0	1	1	0
2007–08	ERC Ingolstadt	DEL	53	4	9	13	73	3	2	1	3	0
2008–09	Kassel Huskies	DEL	52	3	7	10	78	—	—	—	—	—
2009–10	Anyang Halla	AL	33	6	14	20	36	9	0	7	7	14
2010–11	Anyang Halla	AL	36	3	9	12	45	4	0	1	1	6
2011–12	Coventry Blaze	EIHL	51	12	17	29	20	2	0	0	0	2
2012–13	Arystan Temirtau	KHC	54	5	14	19	20	13	1	1	2	6
2013–14	Anyang Halla	AL	42	5	20	25	28	—	—	—	—	—
2014–15	Arystan Temirtau	KHC	19	3	6	9	10	—	—	—	—	—
2014–15	Arlan Kokshetau	KHC	16	0	4	4	8	14	1	5	6	12
AHL totals			301	9	35	44	161	19	0	1	1	8

== Awards and achievements ==
- 2009–10 - Asia League (ALH) Champion
- 2010–11 - Asia League (ALH) Champion
