= Shim Eui-sik =

South Korean ice hockey player

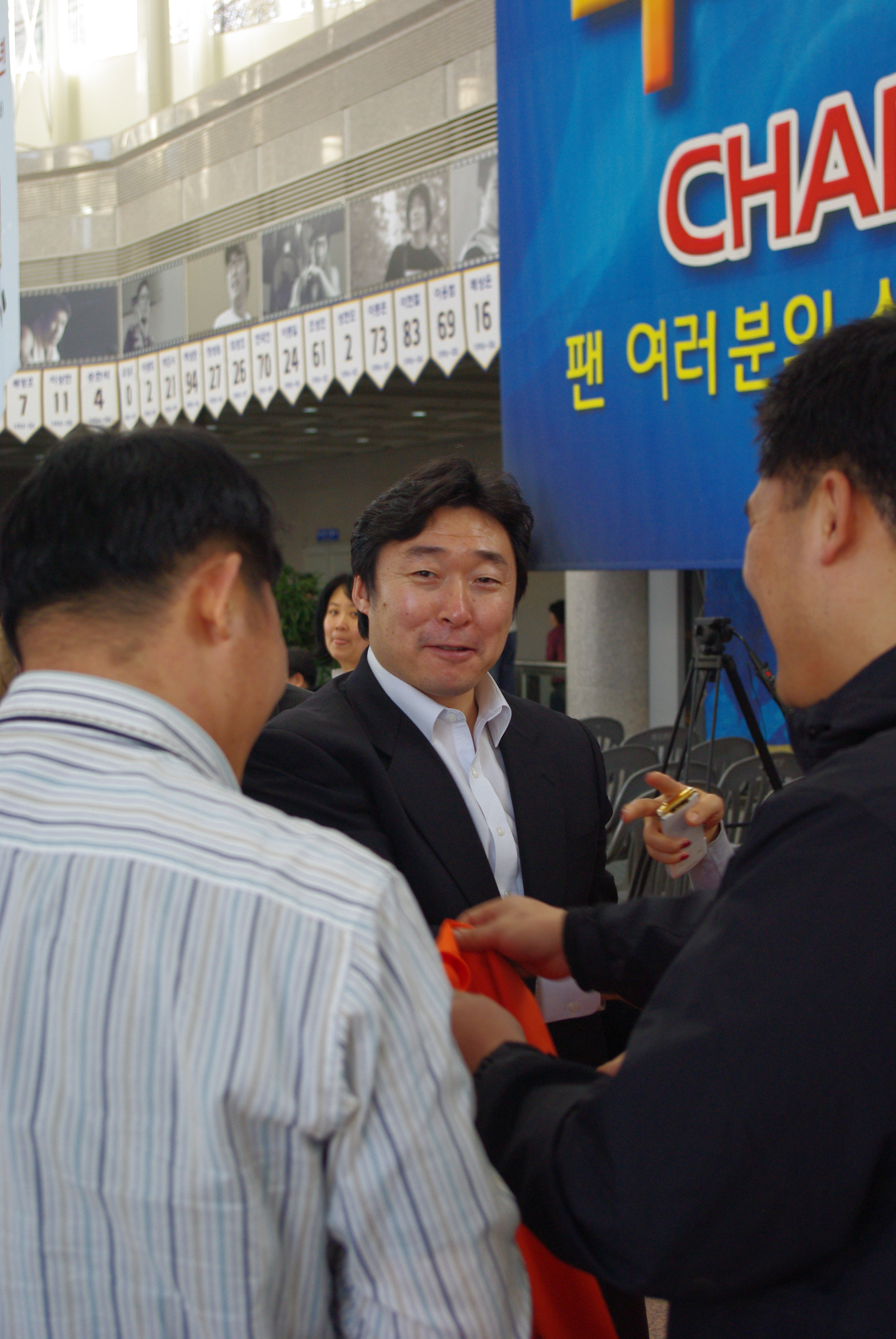
- Born: December 5, 1969 (age 56) South Korea
- Height: 5 ft 10 in (178 cm)
- Weight: 166 lb (75 kg; 11 st 12 lb)
- Position: Forward
- Shot: Left
- Played for: Anyang Halla
- National team: South Korea
- Playing career: 1994–2006

Medal record

Representing South Korea

Men's Ice hockey

Asian Games
| Bronze medal – third place | 1990 Sapporo | Team |

Shim Eui-sik (Korean: 심의식 born December 5, 1969) is a former professional ice hockey forward. He was the first player to reach 100 goals and 100 points in Korean ice hockey history.

After 4 years of University (Yeon-Sae) he signed with Anyang Halla and played for his whole career (1994–2006). He retired in 2006. Shim also played for the Korean national team from 1994 to 2004. The team retired his number 91, in 2007. The Korean media have referred to him as the 'Korean version of Gretzky'.

On April 24, 2008, Shim became the team's 4th head coach in Franchise history. He was named the "Coach of the Event" in the 2009 Korea Domestic Championship which saw Halla take top honours.

On March 28, 2010, Anyang Halla became the first non-Japanese club to win Asia League post-season title.

== Coaching Record (AL Hockey 2008–2014) ==
complete records for previous seasons

| Season | GP | W | W(OT) | W(GWS)* | T | L(GWS)* | L(OT) | L | GF | GA | PTS | Finish | Playoffs |
|---|---|---|---|---|---|---|---|---|---|---|---|---|---|
| 2008–09 | 36 | 22 | 1 | 2 | — | 2 | 2 | 7 | 150 | 105 | 76 | 1st/7 | Lost in semifinals |
| 2009–10 | 36 | 23 | 2 | 1 | — | 3 | 1 | 6 | 180 | 109 | 79 | 1st/7 | Won Championship |
| 2010–11 | 36 | 17 | 4 | 2 | — | 1 | 3 | 9 | 130 | 94 | 67 | 4th/7 | Won Co-Championship |
| 2011–12 | 36 | 20 | 1 | 3 | — | 3 | 1 | 8 | 154 | 107 | 72 | 2nd/7 | Lost in semifinals |
| 2012–13 | 42 | 21 | 0 | 2 | — | 3 | 3 | 13 | 187 | 141 | 73 | 4th/7 | Lost in semifinals |
| 2013–14 | 42 | 17 | 2 | 2 | — | 1 | 4 | 16 | 152 | 110 | 64 | 6th/8 | Out of Playoffs |

*prior to the 2008–2009 season, there were no shoot-outs and games ended in a tie

== Player statistics ==
| League | Years | GP | G | A | Pts |
| Korean League | 1994–2003 | 117 | 118 | 53 | 171 |
| Asia League | 2003–2006 | 86 | 18 | 12 | 30 |
| Totals | | 203 | 136 | 65 | 201 |
