= Patrik Martinec =

Czech ice hockey player and coach

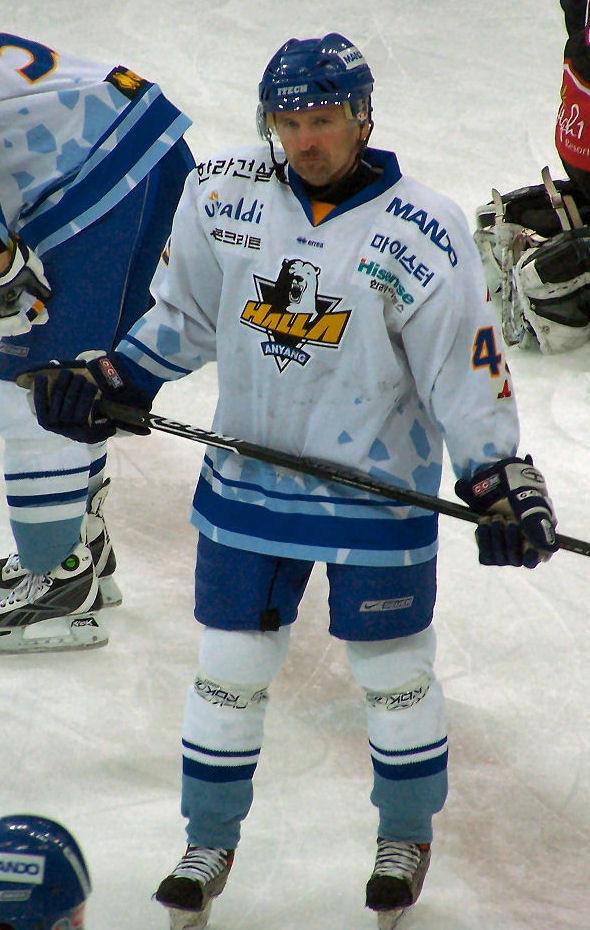
- Born: September 4, 1971 (age 54) Jilemnice, CS
- Height: 5 ft 8 in (173 cm)
- Weight: 165 lb (75 kg; 11 st 11 lb)
- Position: Centre
- Shot: Left
- Played for: Extraliga; HC Pardubice; Hradec Králové; Sparta Praha; HC Slavia Praha; HC Litvínov; RSL; AK Bars Kazan; ALH; Anyang Halla
- National team: Czech Republic
- Playing career: 1990–2010

Patrik Martinec (born September 4, 1971 in Jilemnice, Czechoslovakia) is a former professional ice hockey forward who played his last five seasons for Anyang Halla of the Asia League Ice Hockey, from South Korea. While playing for Halla, he earned the nickname "Grandfather" (Korean: 할아버지) because of the age difference between him and most of the players on the team.

On June 18, 2010, Martinec was officially hired as assistant coach. He signed a one-year deal. The following season, he joined HC Sparta Praha, spending the first season there as an assistant coach and the subsequent three seasons as head coach. In May 2016, Anyang Halla announced that he was taking over as head coach from Jiří Veber. He would have taken over two years earlier, but had to see out his ongoing contract and had suggested Veber to Anyang Halla.

== Career highlights ==
Czech Extraliga

1998-1999 season:

- Extraliga Most Assists (46)

1999-2000 season:

- Extraliga Champion

2000-2001 season:

- Extraliga Most Assists (37)
- Extraliga Most Points (59)

2013-2014 season:

- Extraliga Semi-finalist (Coach)

2014-2015 season:

- Extraliga Semi-finalist (Coach)

2015-2016 season:

- Extraliga Championship Runner-up (Coach)

Asia League Ice Hockey

2006-2007 season:

- AHIL Best Playmaking Forward
- AHIL Most Assists (53)
- AHIL Most Points (71)

2008-2009 season:

- AHIL Best Playmaking Forward

2009-2010 season:

- AHIL Best Playmaking Forward
- AHIL Champion
- AHIL Regular Season MVP

== Career statistics ==
			Regular season					Playoffs
Season	Team	League	GP	G	A	Pts	PIM	GP	G	A	Pts	PIM
1988–89	TJ Stadion Hradec Králové	CZE.2		11				—	—	—	—	—
1989–90	TJ Stadion Hradec Králové	CZE.2		11				—	—	—	—	—
1990–91	TJ Stadion Hradec Králové	CZE.2						—	—	—	—	—
1990–91	TJ Tesla Pardubice	TCH	25	5	19	24	4	—	—	—	—	—
1991–92	HC Pardubice	TCH	38	13	16	29		5	3	2	5
1992–93	HC Pardubice	TCH	20	6	9	15		—	—	—	—	—
1993–94	HC Stadion Hradec Králové	ELH	48	15	25	40	34	—	—	—	—	—
1994–95	Sparta Praha	ELH	44	14	27	41	20	—	—	—	—	—
1995–96	Sparta Praha	ELH	39	15	30	45	14	12	5	8	13	10
1996–97	Sparta Praha	ELH	46	20	27	47	10	10	3	5	8	2
1997–98	Sparta Praha	ELH	51	16	25	41	43	8	1	3	4	8
1998–99	Sparta Praha	ELH	50	10	44	54	18	8	4	0	4	4
1999–2000	Sparta Praha	ELH	51	16	39	55	22	9	3	4	7	2
2000–01	Sparta Praha	ELH	52	22	37	59	32	4	0	1	1	0
2001–02	AK Bars Kazan	RSL	29	7	10	17	8	—	—	—	—	—
2002–03	Sparta Praha	ELH	47	8	22	30	34	9	0	1	1	2
2003–04	Slavia Praha	ELH	39	10	17	27	24	18	2	5	7	10
2004–05	Slavia Praha	ELH	29	1	5	6	10	—	—	—	—	—
2004–05	HC Chemopetrol, a.s.	ELH	11	1	1	2	4	6	1	0	1	14
2005–06	Anyang Halla	ALH	38	21	44	65	38	4	0	3	3	12
2006–07	Anyang Halla	ALH	34	18	53	71	26	3	2	1	3	2
2007–08	Anyang Halla	ALH	29	7	29	36	34	3	1	3	4	2
2008–09	Anyang Halla	ALIH	35	13	37	50	28	5	3	2	5	2
2009–10	Anyang Halla	ALIH	36	11	40	51	36	1	0	1	1	2
TCH totals			83	24	44	68		5	3	2	5
ELH totals			502	148	299	447	265	84	19	27	46	52
ALH totals			172	70	203	273	162	16	6	10	16	20
