= HL Anyang =

South Korean professional ice hockey team

- City: Anyang, South Korea
- League: Asia League Ice Hockey
- Founded: December 1994; 31 years ago
- Home arena: Anyang Ice Arena
- Colours: Blue, white
- Owner: HL Group
- General manager: Kim Chang-bum
- Head coach: Jim Paek
- Captain: Ahn Jin-hui
- Website: www.hlicehockey.com
Home colours	Away colours

Franchise history
- 1994–1997: Mando Winia
- 1998–2004: Halla Winia
- 2004–2005: Anyang Halla Winia
- 2005–2022: Anyang Halla
- 2022–present: HL Anyang

Championships
- Asia League regular season: 8 (2009, 2010, 2015, 2016, 2017, 2023, 2024, 2025)
- Asia League championship: 9 (2010, 2011, 2016, 2017, 2018, 2020, 2023, 2024, 2025)

HL Anyang (Korean: HL 안양) is a professional ice hockey team based in Anyang in Gyeonggi Province, South Korea. It is one of the founding and current members of the Asia League Ice Hockey (ALIH). Formed in 1994, it is the oldest professional ice hockey team in South Korea. The club is financially supported by the HL Group (formerly Halla Group).

At its inception the team was based in Mok-dong, Seoul and named the Mando Winia. In 1998 the team took the name of Mando's parent company, Halla. After the collapse of the Korean Ice Hockey League in 2003, they were the only team to survive. They joined four Japanese teams to create the new Asia League Ice Hockey. In 2005, the team moved to its current hometown of Anyang, where it plays its home games at the Anyang Ice Arena. After two years of finishing in fifth place, they became the first non-Japanese team to finish first in the regular season in 2008–09. However, they failed to defeat the Nippon Paper Cranes in the semi-finals. In the following season, Halla again finished first and won the semi-final and final series, giving them their first play-off series win and first Asia League Championship. The club captured their second AL title after the league cancelled the championship final due to the earthquake in Japan. Asia League announced Halla and Tohoku Free Blades as the co-champions. In 2022, the team rebranded as HL Anyang.

== Team history ==
=== 1994–2003: pre-Asia League Ice Hockey ===
The team was founded in 1994 by the Halla Group to help promote hockey in Korea. The Halla Group also felt that by creating an ice hockey team, it would help them to fulfill their role as a responsible corporation by providing something to the community. The team was originally named "Mando Winia". It was so named because Mando is a subsidiary company of Halla and Winia is a brand of air conditioner sold by the company. In 1997 the team was disbanded for a short time during the 1997 Asian financial crisis. However, the chairman of Halla Group, Chung Mong-won, fought to keep the team.

As a member of the Korean Ice Hockey League the team won the championship five times. During this time, the team also changed their name from "Mando Winia" to "Halla Winia". The team first looked at adding foreign players to their roster in late 2001 with other members of the Korean League. In 2003, the team was one of the founding members of Asia League Ice Hockey.

=== 2003–present: Asia League Ice Hockey ===
While the team participates primarily in the Asia League, they also play in tournaments like the All Korea Ice Hockey Championship each year. In the inaugural year of Asia League Ice Hockey, Halla played a shortened seasons of only 16 games, and failed to break .500. In the following year they brought Esa Tikkanen, a veteran player of 20 NHL seasons, on board. He was brought on primarily to coach the players but he also played during the team's games. Tikkanen felt that as the players played against more skilled teams their own skill level showed greater improvement. He also felt that they should play more games and that the season was too short. That year the team was also noted for showing great improvement over the first year's effort. Halla finished the season winning 18 games out of 42 with 5 ties. Their top offensive player, Marco Poulsen, finished fifth in the overall points race, however they did not reach their goal that year of making the playoffs, finishing in fifth place one spot out of the playoffs. In the off-season the team changed their name from Anyang Halla Winia to Anyang Halla with the expiration of the sponsorship contract. As well they hired Otakar Vejvoda to be the team's new coach. Vejvoda was considered a legend in the Czech Extraliga both for his skill as a player and a coach.

In the 2005–06 season Halla improved on the previous year's performance finishing in second place. The league saw a reduced season of only 38 games. Song Dong-hwan was the leader in goals for the league with 31 and Patrik Martinec ranked second in assists with 44. Martinec ranked number two on the total points list while Song finished in fourth place. Halla also scored the most short-handed goals of any team in the league with 11. The city of Anyang won an award for being "The best Hockey Town in Asia". The team made the play-offs for the first time since the league's formation. They received a bye in the first round and played Kokudo, the winner of the third place and sixth place match-up. Anyang won only a single game out of the first three which were played on home ice. They were eliminated in the fourth game which was played in Kokudo's home rink by a score of 5–1. Kokudo went on to be the league champions for the second year in a row.

After the conclusion of the 2005–06 season there were some roster changes. Two of the team's top players, Song Dong-hwan and Jang Jong-moon, had to report for compulsory military service. Starting goaltender, Kim Sung-Bae, retired after the previous season. Even though they were missing these players they were noted for having more players with more than 10 goals and 10 assists than in the previous season. With the departure of Song offensive output dropped slightly, the team's top offensive player finished seventh overall in goals with 21. However Martinec won the assists race with 53 and the overall points total with 71. The team shared top spot in the short-handed goals with 2 other teams, scoring 10 over the course of the season. With a further shortened season of only 34 games the team finished in fifth place and faced the other Korean team, Kangwon Land in the quarter-finals. During the regular season Kangwon won six of seven meetings, and the quarter-finals were no different. Kangwon swept Halla in three games, the final game ending in 3–2 with a last minute desperate bid by Halla to tie the game.

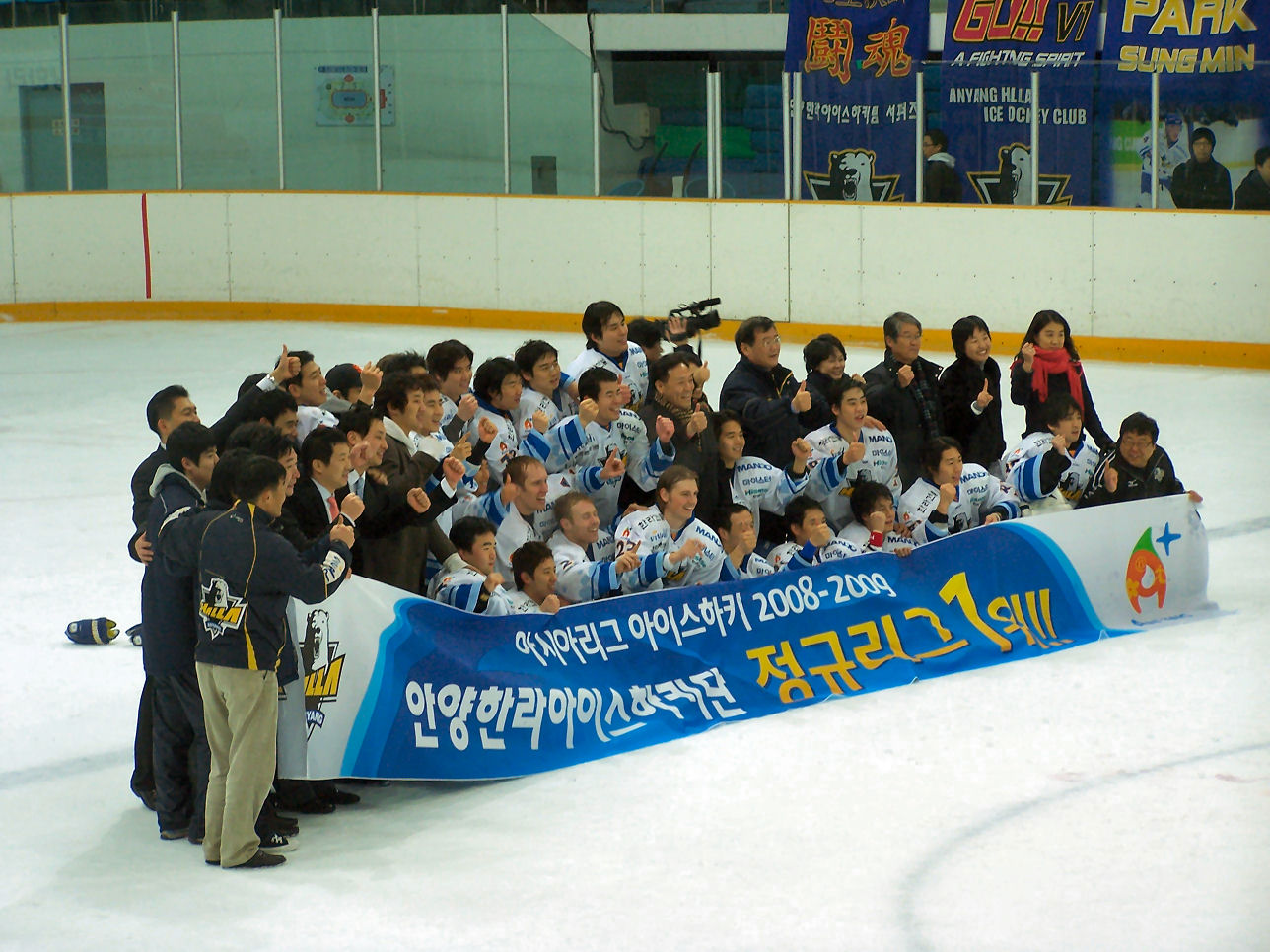
Anyang Halla pose for a celebratory photo after defeating High1 on 25 January 2009

The next season saw the AL further reduce the number of games played to just 30. In the pre-season Halla won the Anyang Cup, which is a pre-season tournament held in Anyang. The team's record in the regular season remained relatively the same and they finished again in fifth place. Lee Yu-Won was the top offensive player with 16 goals and was tied for fourth place with three other players. Martinec continued to contribute many assists to the team and finished in second place with 29, one point off first. He finished in fourth place in the overall point totals. Halla did not have another player in the top 10. The team once again led the league in short-handed goals and gave up the fewest short-handed goals against along with the Oji Eagles. In the playoffs the Halla faced the Nippon Paper Cranes in the first round. During the regular season the two teams split their series, each winning two games. The playoffs told a different story, and Nippon swept Halla in three games. Halla lost each game by a single goal. Vejvoda praised Nippon's goalie for his excellent play and commended his players for their effort.

Following the defeat in the post-season Halla replaced Vejvoda as head coach with Shim Eui-Sik. Shim had spent his entire professional career playing for Halla and during the 2007–2008 season he was the coach of Little Halla. As a player Shim had 30 points in 80 games. He vowed to reorganize the team and set his sights on a league championship. The team's general manager also hired Samuel H. Kim, then an analyst for SBS Sports and previously an NHL reporter from Vancouver, as a scout for the organization. Halla moved away from the heavy Czech influence which had previously dominated the team and filled three of the four spots for foreign players on the team with players from North America. Brock Radunske, Brad Fast and Jon Awe became the first three players from North America to play for the team. They also arranged for Eric Thurston, the head coach of University of Alberta's team, to spend the first three weeks of the training camp assisting the new coach and new North American players. Martinec was the only Czech player to remain on the team. In addition to the new foreigner players, Song Dong-hwan and Jang Jong-moon returned from military service. In the 2008 pre-season Anyang Cup, Halla finished fourth out of five teams. The AL increased the number of regular season games for the 2008–09 season to 36. In September head coach Shim was suspended for five games for refusal to play. The incident stemmed from a goal that was scored as the final buzzer sounded during a 21 September game against High1. Halla entered the dressing room and refused to return to the ice. The league considered the game a forfeit. Anyang Halla finished the season in first place with a total of 76 points. Their defeat of their rivals High1 in the final game of the season marks the first time a non-Japanese team had finished first place in the Asia League. Brock Radunske captured the titles for both the most goals scored with 29 and most points on the season with 57. Martinec finished in second place for the second year in a row in the assists category with 47. Overall the team finished with five players in the top ten in the overall points tally. For the first time the team ended the season with the number one powerplay scoring 54 goals. In contrast to earlier seasons the team did not lead the league in short-handed goals, ranking in the middle of the pack both in goals for and against. They were the only team not shutout during the regular season. After receiving a bye in the first round of the play-offs Halla had to face the Nippon Paper Cranes in the semi-final. They returned to Anyang for game six of the series leading 3–2. They were expected to win the series but Nippon's Ilmura scored two game-winning goals and the Japanese club defeated Anyang in 7 games.

Halla opened the 2009–10 season with a loss on home ice, but at the midpoint of the season they were tied for first place with the Oji Eagles. The league maintained the number of games at 36. The first half of the season saw Halla plagued with injuries. Particularly hard hit were the team's foreign imports. After the third game of the season Jon Awe was diagnosed with a sports hernia that required surgery and was scheduled to miss 8–12 weeks. On 29 November, Brad Fast received a knee injury that would sideline him for 4–6 months, ending his season. Brock Radunske was also on the injury list with a concussion, while Patrik Martinec was day to day with a lower-body injury. Halla replaced Awe quickly with Dustin Wood, who has played in both the American Hockey League and Deutsche Eishockey Liga. Fast was replaced by Lee Don-ku from Yonsei University. Halla also had several other regular players injured including Kim Won-jun, Kim Kyu-hun, and Lee Seung-yup. After 18 games Halla led the league with 94 goals. On 31 January 2010 Halla defeated the Oji Eagles in overtime by a score of 4–3, clinching first place for the second year in a row. The win also set up a semi-final match-up against Korean rivals High1, guaranteeing that a Korean team would appear in the final for the first time in league history. Halla won all of their series against opposing teams, except against their rival High1. Of 18 possible points available in their six-game series, Halla took only eight. They were the only team to win a series against the Nippon Paper Cranes. The team led the league in goals scored with 180. Individually, Kim Ki-sung led the team in goals scored with 22, while Patrik Martinec again led with 40 assists and 51 points. Halla finished with five players in the top ten-point list. The team also led in both powerplay goals for, with 57, powerplay percentage, with 34.97%, and shorthanded goals for, with 10. In the annual end of season awards, Patrik Martinec took the award for Most Valuable Player and Best Playmaking. Cho Min-ho took the award for Young Guy of the Year. Anyang city won the award for Best Hockey Town for the second time for their spirit and sell-out crowds. Anyang Halla defeated High1 by a score of 5–2 to win the semi-finals three games to one, winning their first play-off series and becoming the first Korean team to play for the Championship Cup. Halla faced the Cranes, who had knocked them out of the playoffs twice, in the final. The series went to the full five games and four of the games went to overtime. Brock Radunske scored two overtime winners and assisted Kim Woo-Jae in scoring the overtime winner in game five, making Halla the first non-Japanese team to win the Asia League Championship. Radunske was named MVP while head coach Shim was named "Coach of the Year". After retiring as a player, Martinec signed a 1-year deal to work as an assistant coach on the team.

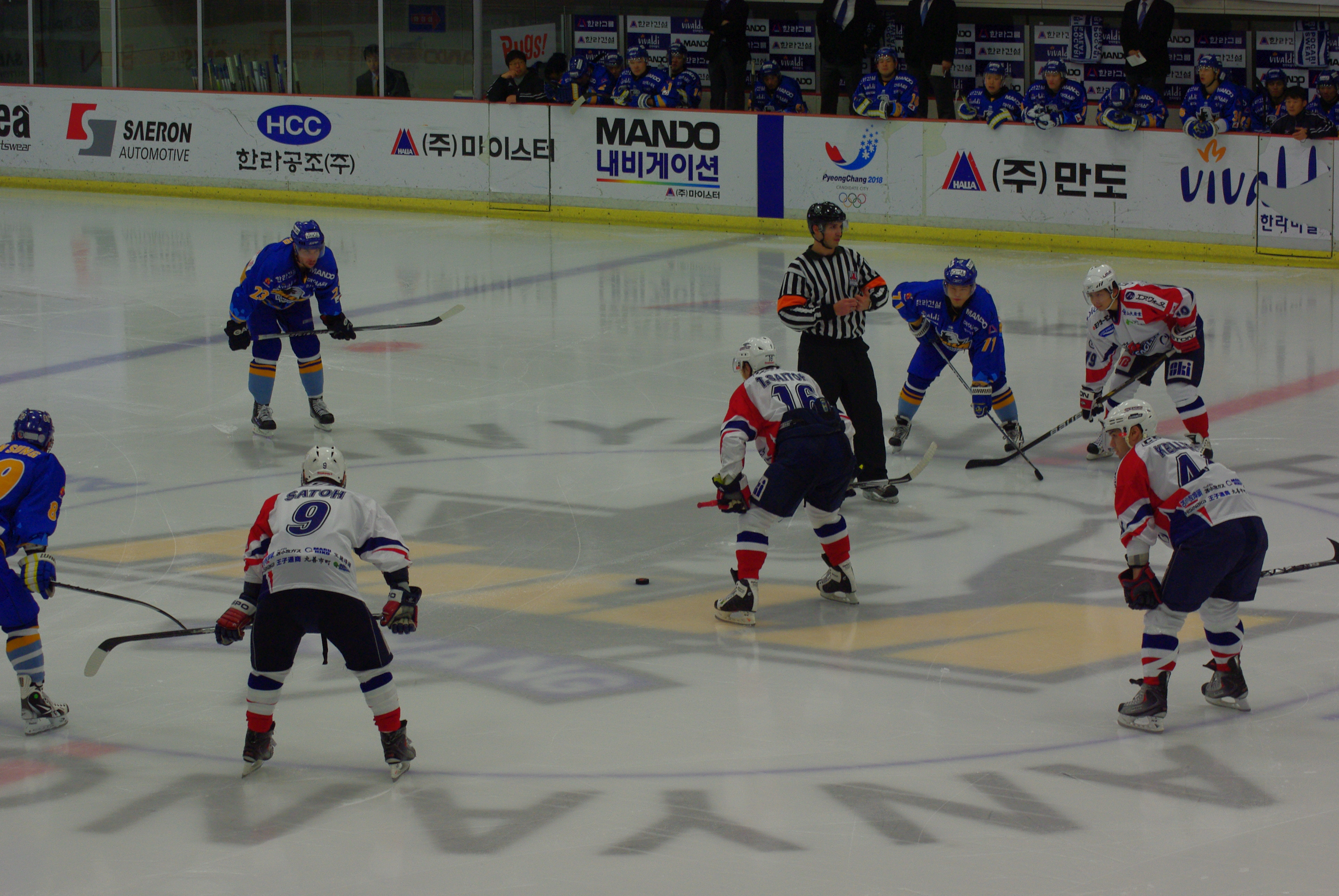
Halla defeated the Oji Eagles in the fourth game of the first round of the 2010–2011 play-offs to advance.

Like the previous season, Halla lost the opening game against High1. However, they once again found themselves on top at the midpoint of the season. The team was second in the league in goals scored with 65. Halla retained Dustin Wood who was brought in as a replacement in the previous season. On 14 November 2010 the team defended their Korea Domestic Championship title against High1 by defeating them 5–1 in the final game of the week-long tournament. After finishing first two consecutive years, Halla finished in fourth place one point behind the Free Blades. They won their season series against all teams except the Cranes and Eagles. They also finished fifth in goals scored with 130, one behind High1, but allowed the second fewest goals with 94, three behind the Eagles. While the team's penalty kill was ranked fifth in the league, they were tied for the most short-handed goals with the Cranes with six goals. Their powerplay was ranked third, and they gave up the second fewest short-handed goals. Brock Radunske led the team with 20 goals and finished fourth in the league. Cho Min-ho also made the top ten ranking and finished in eight place with 18 goals. Kim Ki-sung was the only Halla player to make the top ten in assists and finished in tenth place with 27. Overall Cho Min-ho led the team with 44 points and finished ninth in the league. Dustin Wood led the team in penalty minutes with 45. With their fourth-place finish, Halla had to face the Eagles in the first round of the playoffs. The series began in Japan, but Halla took two of three games and upon returning to South Korea they won the fourth game of the best-of-five series and knocked the Eagles out. The Free Blades defeated the Cranes and Halla were set to face them on 12 March 2011 in Sendai, Japan. However, a 9.0 magnitude earthquake struck the Sendai area about one hour after the team landed there to prepare for the games. The League immediately cancelled the three games scheduled in Sendai and on 22 March 2011 they officially cancelled the final series, award co-championship titles to both Anyang Halla and Tohoku Free Blades. This decision made Halla only the second team to capture back-to-back championships since the league's inception.

== Community contributions ==
As a team and organization the Halla have engaged in charitable work. In 2008 they had two charity games on 27 and 28 December. The admission fee was waved and instead fans were asked to make donations. The proceeds were donated to the poor children of Anyang city as well as the sick children's hospital. On 19 December 2009 The Anyang Halla organization donated 20,000 won for each goal that had been scored in the season to charity, totaling just over 2 million won. On 25 and 26 December 2010 Halla repeated their charity game series, and offered free admission to the game in exchange for donations to the sick children's hospitals in Gyeonggi Province. After the cancellation of the final series, the team held a charity game on 22 March 2011 to raise money for the Japanese earthquake victims. Instead of raising a trophy to celebrate their championship, the team took a final photo holding signs of sympathy and encouragement for Japan. The team raised almost 20 million won in donations for Japan. The team maintains a yearly tradition of giving free admission to students who take the College Scholastic Ability Test (CSAT) to promote rest and comfort after the difficult exam.

== Media ==
The club launched a new radio broadcast deal in 2007 with Afreeca.com. On 11 May 2009, SBS Sports acquired a five-year broadcast contract with the club.

== Arena ==
The Anyang Ice Arena is located within the Anyang Sports Complex and was opened on 24 November 2000. It seats 1,284 spectators. The ice rink is also used for short track and figure skating among other sports. The team previously used the Mok-dong Ice Rink in Seoul.

== Honours ==
- Korean Ice Hockey League:

Winners (5): 1997–98, 1999–2000, 2001–02, 2002–03, 2003–04

- Korea National Ice Hockey Championship:

Winners (13): 1996, 1997, 1999, 2000, 2005, 2009, 2010, 2014, 2016, 2021, 2022, 2023, 2024

- Asia League Ice Hockey:

Regular season winners (8): 2008–09, 2009–10, 2014–15, 2015–16, 2016–17, 2022–23, 2023–24, 2024–25
Championship winners (9): 2009–10, 2010–11,^{[a]} 2015–16, 2016–17, 2017–18, 2019–20,^{[b]} 2022–23, 2023–24, 2024–25

a: Shared with Tohoku Free Blades
b: Shared with PSK Sakhalin

== Team records ==
As of the 2022–23 season. Only Asia League games are included.

- Most games played: Kim Ki-sung, 425
- Most goals scored: Kim Ki-sung, 222
- Most assists: Brock Radunske, 318
- Most points accumulated: Brock Radunske, 534

== Current roster ==
Squad for the 2024–25 season.

Goaltenders
No.	Country	Player	Date of birth (age)
20	(South Korea)	Ha Jung-ho	21 July 2000 (age 26)
32	(South Korea)	Lee Yeon-seung	17 April 1995 (age 31)
86	(South Korea)	Matt Dalton	4 July 1986 (age 40)

Defencemen
No.	Country	Player	Date of birth (age)
5	(South Korea)	Kim Won-jun	4 May 1991 (age 35)
6	(South Korea)	Oh In-gyo – A	29 October 1997 (age 29)
8	(South Korea)	Yoo Beom-suk	24 April 1998 (age 28)
23	(South Korea)	Lee Min-jae	23 March 2000 (age 26)
24	(South Korea)	Ji Hyo-seok	15 March 1999 (age 27)
26	(Japan)	Rioto Takeya	25 July 2001 (age 25)
58	(South Korea)	Nam Hee-doo	28 March 1997 (age 29)
61	(South Korea)	Lee Don-ku	7 February 1988 (age 38)
82	(Japan)	Yusei Otsu	22 December 1995 (age 30)

Forwards
No.	Country	Player	Date of birth (age)
11	(South Korea)	Lee Ju-hyung	11 May 1998 (age 28)
13	(South Korea)	Lee Young-jun	3 January 1991 (age 35)
18	(South Korea)	Bae Sang-ho	4 March 2001 (age 25)
19	(South Korea)	Kim Sang-wook	21 April 1988 (age 38)
27	(South Korea)	Ahn Jin-hui – C	6 March 1991 (age 35)
36	(South Korea)	Jeon Jung-woo – A	27 May 1994 (age 32)
42	(Japan)	Chikara Hanzawa	12 July 2001 (age 25)
47	(South Korea)	Shin Sang-hoon	1 August 1993 (age 33)
63	(South Korea)	Park Jin-kyu	18 December 1991 (age 34)
71	(South Korea)	Kim Seong-jae	9 September 2001 (age 25)
72	(South Korea)	Kim Geon-woo	20 March 1999 (age 27)
77	(South Korea)	Lee Jong-min	10 May 1999 (age 27)
84	(South Korea)	Lee Hyun-seung	5 July 1991 (age 35)
89	(South Korea)	Kang Min-wan	28 March 2000 (age 26)
92	(South Korea)	Kang Yoon-seok	23 September 1992 (age 34)

== Leaders ==
=== Team captains ===
- Lee Dong-ho, 1994–1998
- Rho Jung-won, 1998–2000
- Shim Eui-sik, 2000–2002
- Kim Chang-bum, 2002–2004
- Park Sung-min, 2004–2006
- Kim Woo-jae, 2006–2012
- Kim Woo-young, 2012–2014
- Park Woo-sang, 2014–2016
- Kim Won-jung, 2016–2018
- Cho Min-ho, 2018–2022
- Park Jin-kyu, 2022–2024
- Ahn Jin-hui, 2024–present

=== Head coaches ===
- Kim Sae-il, 1994–2004
- Byun Sun-wook, 2004–2005
- Otakar Vejvoda, 2005–2008
- Shim Eui-sik, 2008–2014
- Jiri Veber, 2014–2016
- Patrik Martinec, 2016–2021
- Jim Paek, 2021–present

== Season-by-season record ==
=== Asia League ===
Season	GP	W	W (OT)	W (pen)*	T	L (pen)*	L (OT)	L	GF	GA	Pts.	Finish	Playoffs
2003–04	16	5	1	—	0	—	0	10	45	86	17	3rd of 5	—
2004–05	42	17	1	—	5	—	1	18	152	140	59	5th of 8	Did not qualify
2005–06	38	25	0	—	0	—	3	10	164	100	78	2nd of 9	Semifinals
2006–07	34	16	0	—	2	—	1	15	146	117	51	5th of 8	Quarterfinals
2007–08	30	13	1	—	2	—	1	13	93	92	44	5th of 7	Quarterfinals
2008–09	36	22	1	2	—	2	2	7	150	105	76	1st of 7	Semifinals
2009–10	36	23	2	1	—	3	1	6	180	109	79	1st of 7	Champions
2010–11	36	17	4	2	—	1	3	9	130	94	67	4th of 7	Co-champions
2011–12	36	20	1	3	—	3	1	8	154	107	72	2nd of 7	Semifinals
2012–13	42	21	0	2	—	3	3	13	187	141	73	4th of 7	Semifinals
2013–14	42	17	2	2	—	1	4	16	152	110	64	6th of 8	Did not qualify
2014–15	48	29	0	2	—	5	3	9	182	111	99	1st of 9	Runners-up
2015–16	48	33	2	4	—	0	3	6	206	86	114	1st of 9	Champions
2016–17	48	36	3	2	—	2	0	5	210	91	120	1st of 9	Champions
2017–18	28	12	2	2	—	2	1	9	80	61	47	2nd of 8	Champions
2018–19	34	15	3	3	—	0	2	11	90	69	59	3rd of 8	Semifinals
2019–20	36	23	2	1	—	1	0	9	128	68	76	2nd of 7	Co-champions
2022–23	40	31	0	0	—	4	0	5	166	64	97	1st of 6	Champions
2023–24	32	22	0	1	—	2	1	6	126	81	71	1st of 5	Champions
2024–25	32	18	1	0	—	2	4	7	115	77	62	1st of 5	Champions
2025–26	40	24	2	1	—	0	4	9	136	102	82	2nd of 6	Runners-up
Totals	774	439	28	28	9	31	38	201	2992	2011	1507	—	9 Championships

*Prior to the 2008–09 season, there were no shoot-outs and games ended in a tie.

== Import players ==
Prior to the 2008–09 season, the club drew most of their imports from the Czech Republic, including their head coach.

Canada

- Brock Radunske (Note: Initially registered as imports, the players later obtained South Korean citizenship and were not counted as import players anymore.) 2008–2018, C/LW
- Brad Fast 2008–2011, D
- Dustin Wood 2009–2014, D
- Ric Jackman 2011–2013, D
- Mark Derlago 2012–2013, LW
- Matt Dalton 2014–2025, G
- Alex Plante 2015–2020, D
- Eric Regan 2015–2020, D
- Scott Barney 2017–2018, C/RW

Croatia

- John Hecimovic (Note: Played for Croatia internationally; also holds Canadian citizenship.) 2011–2012, RW

Czech Republic

- Aleš Zima 2003–2004, F
- Michal Madl 2003–2004, D
- Daniel Seman 2005–2006, D
- Jaroslav Nedvěd 2005–2007, D
- Zdeněk Nedvěd 2005–2007, RW
- Patrik Martinec 2005–2010, C
- Pavel Falta 2006–2007, G
- Tomas Hruby 2007–2008, F
- Patrik Hucko 2007–2008, D
- Milan Kopecký 2007–2008, C
- Filip Stefanka 2007–2008, D
- Karel Pilař 2016–2017, D

Finland

- Vesa Ponto 2004–2005, D
- Marco Poulsen 2004–2005, C
- Esa Tikkanen 2004–2005, LW

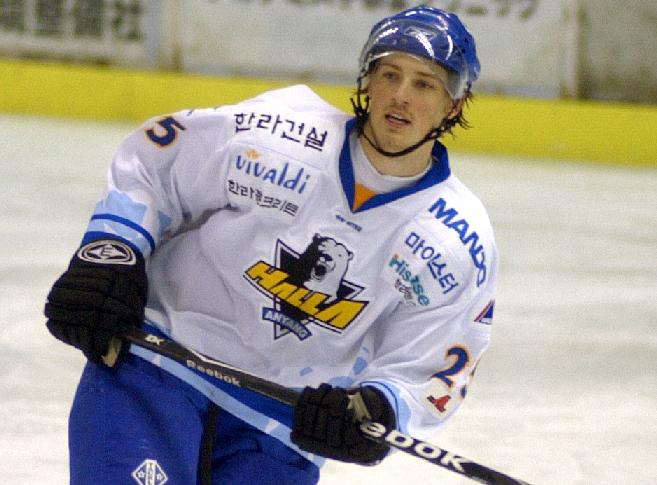
Brock Radunske

Russia

- Ruslan Bernikov 2017–2018, LW
- Nikolai Lemtyugov 2018–2019, LW/RW

Slovakia

- Miroslav Stefanka 2003–2004, C

United States

- Jon Awe 2008–2011, D
- Alex Kim 2010–2012, C
- Jeff Dimmen 2013–2015, D
- Mike Testwuide 2013–2017, RW
- Mike Radja 2016–2017, C
- Bill Thomas 2018–2020, RW
- Troy Milam 2019–2020, D

== Retired numbers ==
- 43 Patrik Martinec (2005–2010)
- 86 Matt Dalton (2014–2025)
- 87 Cho Min-ho (2008–2022) scored the first goal in South Korean Olympic hockey history at the 2018 tournament. He died in 2022 at the age of 35 from lung cancer.
- 91 Shim Eui-sik (1994–2006) was the Korean League MVP five times and held the record for most career goals and career points. He spent his entire professional career with the club.
