= Korea Divisional Domestic Championship =

Ice hockey tournament

The Korea Divisional Domestic Championship (Korean: 전국종별아이스하키선수권대회) was a national ice hockey tournament that ran in South Korea for 47 years starting in 1954 (71 years ago). The tournament was originally called the Student Ice Hockey Championship (학생아이스하키선수권대회).

== History ==
=== 1950s ===
Korea University won the 2nd annual tournament on January 14, 1955, by a score of 2–1 over Yonsei University. The team consisted of only six members: Jeong Sang-sik, Kim Gyeong-bae, Hong Woo-sik, Lee Jong-hwan, Choi Geon-hee, and Go Jin-guk. In 1956 the tournament was called the Domestic Student Ice Hockey Championship and was again won by Korea University over Yonsei by a score of 4–2. The fourth tournament was won in 1957 by Yonsei University. They defeated Gyeong-gi-go by a score of 5–3 on January 13, 1957. In 1958 the tournament had three divisions: middle school, high school, and university. The middle school division was won by Gyeong-gi, and the high school division was won by Gwang-seong. In 1959 they added a further division called "Open Game". Gyeong-gi again won the middle school division with Seoul taking the high school division. Korea University defeated Shinheung University and Hui-mun-gu won the open game division. They also won the Korea Domestic Championship later the next month.

=== 1960s ===
In 1960 the tournament name was changed to Korea Divisional Domestic Championship and the open game division was not played. Gyeong-gi again won the middle school division, Gwang-seong won the high school division and Korea University defeated Hankuk University of Foreign Studies by a score of 16–2. 1961 saw the middle school division won by Dong-buk. In 1962 the tournament consisted of the middle school, high school and university divisions. Gyeong-bok won the high school division while Kyunghee University won the university division. Dong-buk middle school won their division. The 10th tournament was held in 1963. The university and general divisions were mixed, and the high school and middle school divisions remained. Korea University won the general division while Gwang-seong won the high school division. Bae-jae won the middle school division. In 1964 Gwang-seong won the middle school division. Yonsei University won the championship, as well as winning in 1965 and 1966. Also in 1966, Gweong-seong won the high school division.
