= Jon Awe =

American ice hockey player (born 1980)

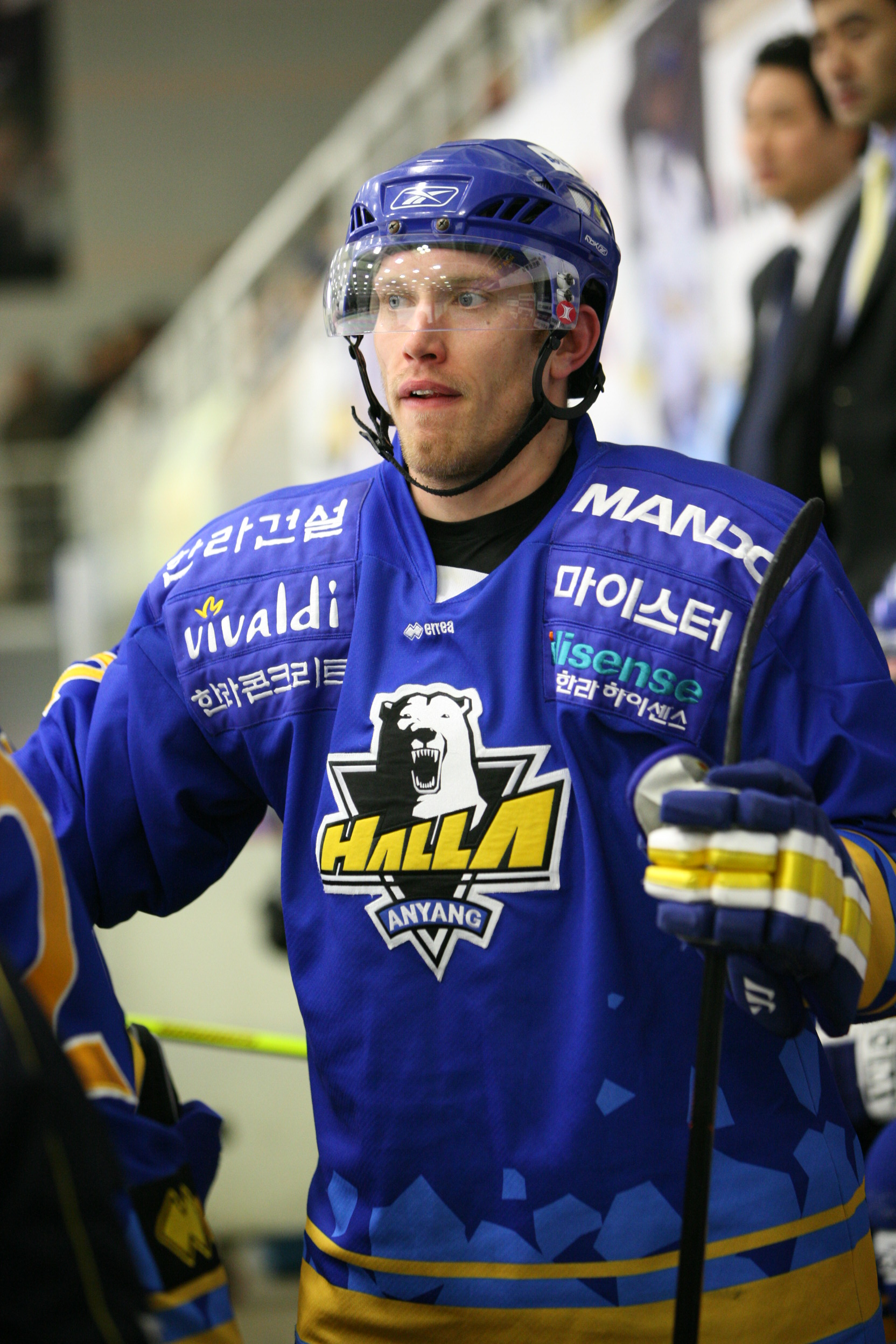
- Born: April 30, 1980 (age 46) Memphis, Tennessee, U.S.
- Height: 6 ft 4 in (193 cm)
- Weight: 240 lb (109 kg; 17 st 2 lb)
- Position: Defense
- Shot: Right
- Played for: Portland Pirates; Providence Bruins; Wilkes-Barre/Scranton Penguins; Chicago Wolves; Houston Aeros; Anyang Halla; HC Valpellice
- NHL draft: Undrafted
- Playing career: 2005–2013

Jon Awe (born April 30, 1980) is an American former professional ice hockey defenseman who played in the American Hockey League (AHL).

== Playing career ==
The 6-foot-4, 240-pound native of Memphis, Tenn., played junior hockey with the South Suburban Steers in the Minnesota Junior Hockey League. Awe played four years at Northeastern University from 2001 to 2005 tallying 32 points (6-26=32) and 90 PIM in 111 games for the Huskies. He led team defensemen in the 2003–04 season with 13 points.

After his senior year with the Huskies, Awe signed with the Gwinnett Gladiators of the ECHL for the 2005–06 season. Awe also made his AHL debut in stints with the Portland Pirates and the Providence Bruins. Awe had an impressive debut professional season and was named to the ECHL All-Rookie Team.

Awe was invited to the Gladiators NHL affiliate, the Atlanta Thrashers, training camp for the 2006–07 season. Failing to earn a contract with the Thrashers, Jon again played primarily for the Gwinnett Gladiators scoring 56 points (24-32=56) and 65 penalty minutes (PIM) in 60 games. At the ECHL All-Star Game he launched 102.2 mph shot in the Hardest Shot competition, obliterating the old mark by 2.9 mph.

Awe split the 2007–08 season with Gwinnett Gladiators and the Houston Aeros. In 59 games with Aeros(AHL), Awe marked a career high 5 goals, 17 assists for 22 points.

Awe signed a one-year deal with Anyang Halla on July 16, 2008, recommended by club's scout & interpreter Samuel H. Kim. He became the first U.S. born player in club's history. After a solid season, in which he tied for 1st overall in defenseman goal scoring with 12 Goals (Tied with Ricard Persson), Awe was signed to 2 year-extension in February 2009. After Halla's September 27, 2009 game against High1 in Goyang it was announced that Awe had a sport's hernia and that he would miss 8 to 12 weeks of the 2009–10 season. Awe captured his first ever championship title, beating Nippon Paper Cranes series of 3–2 in 2009-2010 Asia League final.

On July 13, 2011, Awe signed with HC Valpellice of Italian Serie A on a one-year deal. He returned the following season in 2012–13 to play in 8 games with the Gwinnett Gladiators to end his professional career.

== Career statistics ==
			Regular season					Playoffs
Season	Team	League	GP	G	A	Pts	PIM	GP	G	A	Pts	PIM
1999–00	Texas Tornado	NAHL	52	13	25	38	73	—	—	—	—	—
2000–01	Texas Tornado	NAHL	49	15	19	34	75	—	—	—	—	—
2001–02	Northeastern University	HE	25	3	4	6	10	—	—	—	—	—
2002–03	Northeastern University	HE	24	0	1	1	24	—	—	—	—	—
2003–04	Northeastern University	HE	26	2	11	13	18	—	—	—	—	—
2004–05	Northeastern University	HE	36	2	10	12	38	—	—	—	—	—
2005–06	Gwinnett Gladiators	ECHL	49	14	21	35	49	17	5	4	9	16
2005–06	Portland Pirates	AHL	17	0	1	1	8	—	—	—	—	—
2005–06	Providence Bruins	AHL	1	0	0	0	0	—	—	—	—	—
2006–07	Gwinnett Gladiators	ECHL	60	24	32	56	65	4	1	2	3	2
2006–07	Wilkes-Barre/Scranton Penguins	AHL	2	0	0	0	0	—	—	—	—	—
2006–07	Chicago Wolves	AHL	5	1	3	4	0	—	—	—	—	—
2007–08	Gwinnett Gladiators	ECHL	14	5	5	10	12	—	—	—	—	—
2007–08	Houston Aeros	AHL	59	5	17	22	38	3	0	0	0	2
2008–09	Anyang Halla	AL	35	12	17	29	54	7	2	4	6	10
2009–10	Anyang Halla	AL	18	6	11	17	16	9	2	4	6	18
2010–11	Anyang Halla	AL	36	7	13	20	16	4	2	1	3	0
2011–12	HC Valpellice	ITL	25	7	10	17	20	—	—	—	—	—
2012–13	Gwinnett Gladiators	ECHL	8	2	1	3	4	—	—	—	—	—
AHL totals			84	6	21	27	46	3	0	0	0	2

== Awards and achievements ==
- 2005–06 -ECHL All-Rookie All-Star Team
- 2006–07 -ECHL Defenseman of the Year
- 2006–07 -ECHL First All-Star Team
- 2009–10 -Asia League (ALH) Champion
- 2010–11 -Asia League (ALH) Champion
