= Seo Kwang-suk =

South Korean ice hockey player and coach

Seo Kwang-suk (Korean: 서광석; RR: Seo Gwangseok, born 5 August 1977) is a South Korean ice hockey coach and former player. He was the coach of the Korean national sledge hockey team which won a bronze medal at the 2018 Winter Paralympics, the country's first Paralympic medal in the sport. Seo, who cried tears of joy at the end of the bronze-medal game, received the Paralympic Leader Award at the 10th Small Steel Sports Awards.

Seo graduated from Kyung Hee University and played for the Hyundai Oilbankers in the Korean Ice Hockey League. He also played on the South Korean national team at the 2001 and 2002 Men's Ice Hockey World Championships. He became the coach of the national sledge hockey team after the 2014 Winter Paralympics.
