= Hucko =

Hucko or Hučko is a surname. Notable people with the surname include:

- Ivan Hucko (born 1965), Slovak football manager
- Ján Hucko (1932–2020), Slovak football player and coach
- Ladislav Hučko (1948–2025), Slovak prelate, Greek Catholic apostolic Exarch in Czech Republic
- Patrik Hučko (born 1973), Czech ice hockey player
- Peanuts Hucko (1918–2003), American big band musician
- Tomáš Hučko (born 1985), Slovak football player
