= Mike Testwuide =

American-born South Korean ice hockey player

- Born: February 5, 1987 (age 39) Vail, Colorado, U.S.
- Height: 6 ft 3 in (191 cm)
- Weight: 210 lb (95 kg; 15 st 0 lb)
- Position: Right wing
- Shoots: Right
- ALIH team Former teams: Daemyung Killer Whales; Adirondack Phantoms; Abbotsford Heat; Anyang Halla; High1
- National team: South Korea
- NHL draft: Undrafted
- Playing career: 2010–present

Mike Testwuide (born February 5, 1987) is an American-born South Korean professional ice hockey right winger for the Daemyung Killer Whales. He was a member of South Korea's 2018 Winter Olympics Ice Hockey team that competed in Pyeongchang as the host nation.

== Playing career ==
Testwuide, who was not drafted by an NHL team, signed a two-year entry-level contract with the Philadelphia Flyers on March 19, 2010 after playing four seasons of collegiate hockey with Colorado College. Midway through his third season with the Adirondack Phantoms he was traded to the Calgary Flames for Mitch Wahl.

In the 2013–14 season, Testwuide signed with Anyang Halla of the Asia League Ice Hockey. With the help of Jim Paek and the Korean Olympic Committee, he was granted citizenship of South Korea via an expedited process due to his exemplary athletic ability. In 2015, Testwuide played for the South Korean national team at the IIHF World Championship Division I. Testwuide then went on to captain the South Korean national ice hockey team at the 2018 Winter Olympics in Pyeongchang.

== Career statistics ==
=== Regular season and playoffs ===
			Regular season					Playoffs
Season	Team	League	GP	G	A	Pts	PIM	GP	G	A	Pts	PIM
2003–04	Pikes Peak Miners	18U AAA	65	46	63	109	40	—	—	—	—	—
2004–05	Waterloo Black Hawks	USHL	46	2	8	10	43	4	0	1	1	4
2005–06	Waterloo Black Hawks	USHL	54	18	13	31	88	—	—	—	—	—
2006–07	Colorado College	WCHA	29	8	2	10	25	—	—	—	—	—
2007–08	Colorado College	WCHA	33	11	10	21	31	—	—	—	—	—
2008–09	Colorado College	WCHA	36	4	5	9	20	—	—	—	—	—
2009–10	Colorado College	WCHA	36	21	10	31	26	—	—	—	—	—
2010–11	Adirondack Phantoms	AHL	76	18	21	39	62	—	—	—	—	—
2011–12	Adirondack Phantoms	AHL	66	12	17	29	79	—	—	—	—	—
2012–13	Adirondack Phantoms	AHL	19	2	0	2	27	—	—	—	—	—
2012–13	Abbotsford Heat	AHL	9	2	1	3	28	—	—	—	—	—
2013–14	Anyang Halla	ALH	42	27	27	54	54	—	—	—	—	—
2014–15	Anyang Halla	ALH	46	29	32	61	48	6	4	1	5	0
2015–16	Anyang Halla	ALH	46	35	31	66	56	8	2	3	5	25
2016–17	Anyang Halla	ALH	44	23	21	44	62	1	0	0	0	0
2017–18	High1	ALH	22	9	12	21	20	—	—	—	—	—
2018–19	Daemyung Killer Whales	ALH	32	7	9	16	28	3	0	1	1	2
2019–20	Daemyung Killer Whales	ALH	35	12	9	21	32	—	—	—	—	—
AHL totals			170	34	39	73	196	—	—	—	—	—
ALH totals			267	142	141	283	300	18	6	5	11	27

=== International ===
Year	Team	Event	GP	G	A	Pts	PIM
2015	South Korea	WC D1B	5	4	4	8	0
2016	South Korea	WC D1A	1	0	0	0	2
2017	South Korea	AWG	1	0	0	0	4
2018	South Korea	OG	4	0	0	0	0
Senior totals			11	4	4	8	6
