= Brad Fast =

Canadian ice hockey player (born 1980)

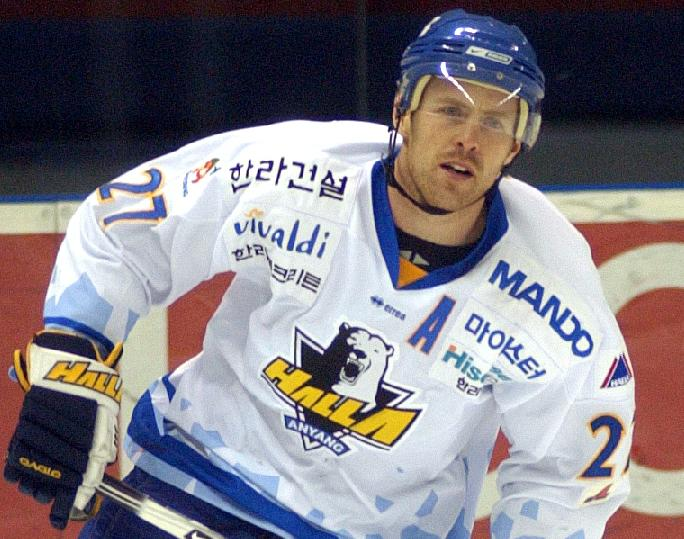
- Born: February 21, 1980 (age 46) Fort St. John, British Columbia, Canada
- Height: 6 ft 0 in (183 cm)
- Weight: 195 lb (88 kg; 13 st 13 lb)
- Position: Defence
- Shot: Left
- Played for: Carolina Hurricanes; SCL Tigers; ERC Ingolstadt; EC Red Bull Salzburg; Anyang Halla
- NHL draft: 84th overall, 1999; Carolina Hurricanes
- Playing career: 2003–2011

Bradley M. Fast (born February 21, 1980) is a Canadian former professional ice hockey defenceman. He spent his amateur career in the British Columbia Hockey League, and was selected in the third round of the 1999 NHL entry draft, 84th overall, by the Carolina Hurricanes. He played in one NHL game for the Hurricanes, scoring a goal, before embarking on a European career.

== Playing career ==
=== Amateur ===
Fast played for his hometown Fort St. John Flyers as a 14-year-old before moving on to the Prince George Spruce Kings in the BCJHL. At the end of his third season in the BCJHL, Fast was drafted by the Hurricanes. After being drafted, Fast enrolled at Michigan State University, where he spent four seasons playing for the Michigan State Spartans. He was the captain for one season and was a collegiate standout at MSU, and was recognized as a star offensive defenceman. He was member of the team for famous outdoor event, The Cold War along with fellow defenseman John-Michael Liles. Near the end of the 2002–03 season, Fast signed a professional contract with the Hurricanes and joined their American Hockey League affiliate, the Lowell Lock Monsters.

=== Professional ===
Fast played seven games with the Lock Monsters to finish off the 2002–03 season, and started with that team full-time for the 2003–04 season. He was called up and played one game with the parent Hurricanes on April 4, 2004, becoming one of only four players to score a goal in his only National Hockey League game. Fast scored the team's sixth goal with 2:26 remaining to send the game into overtime. Former Spartan Rod Brind'Amour (1988–89) set up Fast's game-tying goal. Fast became the 16th Hurricane player to score a goal in his NHL debut. His goal was also the last ever scored that resulted in a tie game in the NHL, as the league moved to a shoot-out the following season.

The 2004–05 lockout season was mostly spent with the Lock Monsters, but Fast was demoted to the ECHL and spent the end of the season (and the playoffs) with the Florida Everblades. Fast was signed by the Los Angeles Kings and played the 2005–06 season with their AHL club, the Manchester Monarchs. Fast signed with the Swiss club Langnau for the 2006–07 season. In the following year, he also played for Red Bull Salzburg EC in the Austrian League.

In May 2008, Fast signed with Anyang Halla for a one-year deal. On September 2, Fast was named assistant captain for Halla. He became the first import player ever to be named assistant captain in franchise history. In February 2009, Fast re-signed for two more years.

After his final year with Anyang Halla, Fast retired.

== Career statistics ==
			Regular season					Playoffs
Season	Team	League	GP	G	A	Pts	PIM	GP	G	A	Pts	PIM
1999–00	Michigan State University	NCAA	42	5	9	14	20	—	—	—	—	—
2000–01	Michigan State University	NCAA	42	4	24	28	16	—	—	—	—	—
2001–02	Michigan State University	NCAA	41	10	16	26	26	—	—	—	—	—
2002–03	Michigan State University	NCAA	39	11	35	46	28	—	—	—	—	—
2002–03	Lowell Lock Monsters	AHL	7	0	1	0	12	—	—	—	—	—
2003–04	Carolina Hurricanes	NHL	1	1	0	1	0	—	—	—	—	—
2003–04	Lowell Lock Monsters	AHL	79	10	25	35	35	—	—	—	—	—
2004–05	Lowell Lock Monsters	AHL	32	1	5	6	23	—	—	—	—	—
2004–05	Florida Everblades	ECHL	14	2	5	7	0	18	1	3	4	6
2005–06	Manchester Monarchs	AHL	62	5	13	18	38	7	0	2	2	8
2006–07	SCL Tigers	NLA	30	3	8	11	22	—	—	—	—	—
2007–08	ERC Ingolstadt	DEL	15	1	3	4	2	3	0	1	1	0
2007–08	EC Red Bull Salzburg	EBEL	26	2	5	7	15	—	—	—	—	—
2008–09	Anyang Halla	AL	33	7	27	34	32	7	0	3	3	6
2009–10	Anyang Halla	AL	18	7	16	23	16	—	—	—	—	—
2010–11	Anyang Halla	AL	22	3	10	13	16	—	—	—	—	—
NHL totals			1	1	0	1	0	—	—	—	—	—

== Awards and achievements ==
Award	Year
BCHL Best Defenseman	1998-99
BCHL Most Sportsmanlike Player	1998-99
CCHA Champion	2000, 2001
CCHA All-Tournament Team	2002
All-CCHA First Team	2002–03
CCHA Best Defensive Defenseman	2002–03
AHCA West Second-Team All-American	2002–03
ALH Champion	2009–2010; 2010–2011

== See also ==
- List of players who played only one game in the NHL

Awards and achievements
Preceded by Mike Komisarek	CCHA Best Defensive Defenseman; 2002-03	Succeeded by Doug Andress
