= Jaroslav Nedvěd =

Czech ice hockey player

- Born: September 24, 1969 (age 56) Liberec, Czechoslovakia
- Height: 6 ft 5 in (196 cm)
- Weight: 216 lb (98 kg; 15 st 6 lb)
- Position: Defence
- Shot: Right
- Played for: HC Sparta Prague; HC Olomouc; Cincinnati Cyclones; Birmingham Bulls; HPK; HC Slovan Bratislava; HC Bílí Tygři Liberec; HC Neftekhimik Nizhnekamsk; MsHK Žilina; Anyang Halla; Acroni Jesenice; HC Plzeň; HC Kladno
- NHL draft: Undrafted
- Playing career: 1988–2012

Jaroslav Nedvěd (born September 24, 1969) is a Czech former professional ice hockey defenceman. He is currently a head coach for HC Sparta Praha of the Czech Extraliga. He is the older brother of Petr Nedvěd.

== Early career ==
Nedvěd started his professional hockey career with IHC Písek and HC Liberec before joining HC Sparta Prague in 1990 for one season. He then spent two seasons with HC Olomouc, scoring 26 points in 41 games in his final season.

== IHL and ECHL ==
Nedvěd spent the 1993-94 season in the United States, playing 44 games in the International Hockey League with the Cincinnati Cyclones and 2 games in the East Coast Hockey League with the Birmingham Bulls.

== Return to Europe ==
Nedvěd would return to the Czech Extraliga for a second spell with Sparta Prague for the next four seasons. He then moved to Finland's SM-liiga and spent one season with HPK before re-joining Sparta Prague for a third time where he spent another four seasons. In 2003 he had a brief spell in Slovakia with HC Slovan Bratislava before joining rejoining Liberec, some 14 years after leaving the team originally. 2004 saw him briefly play in another country, this time in the Russian Superleague with HC Neftekhimik Nizhnekamsk playing just 9 games for them before moving back to Slovakia to join MsHK Zilina.

== Asia League Ice Hockey ==
In 2005, Nedvěd moved to the Asia League Ice Hockey and spent two seasons with Anyang Halla. During the 2005-06 season, Nedvěd led his team with a +/- rating of +57 in 33 games. The following season, Nedvěd would lead the team in penalty minutes (172) and led the league in points scored by a defenseman (50 points), all while playing only 33 games.

== Second return to Europe ==
In 2007, Nedvěd re-joined Sparta Prague for a fourth time, allowing him the chance to play on the same team as his brother Petr. His 85 PIM ranked 4th on the team. In 2008, Nedvěd signed for Slovenian team HK Jesenice of the Austrian Hockey League. In 2009, Nedvěd would sign with HC Berounští Medvědi of the 1 liga, a second-tier Czech hockey league that plays below Extraliga. He would later finish the 2008-2009 season with Plzeň of the Czech Extraliga, where he scored 1 assist in 9 games.
