= Troy Milam =

American ice hockey player (born 1980)

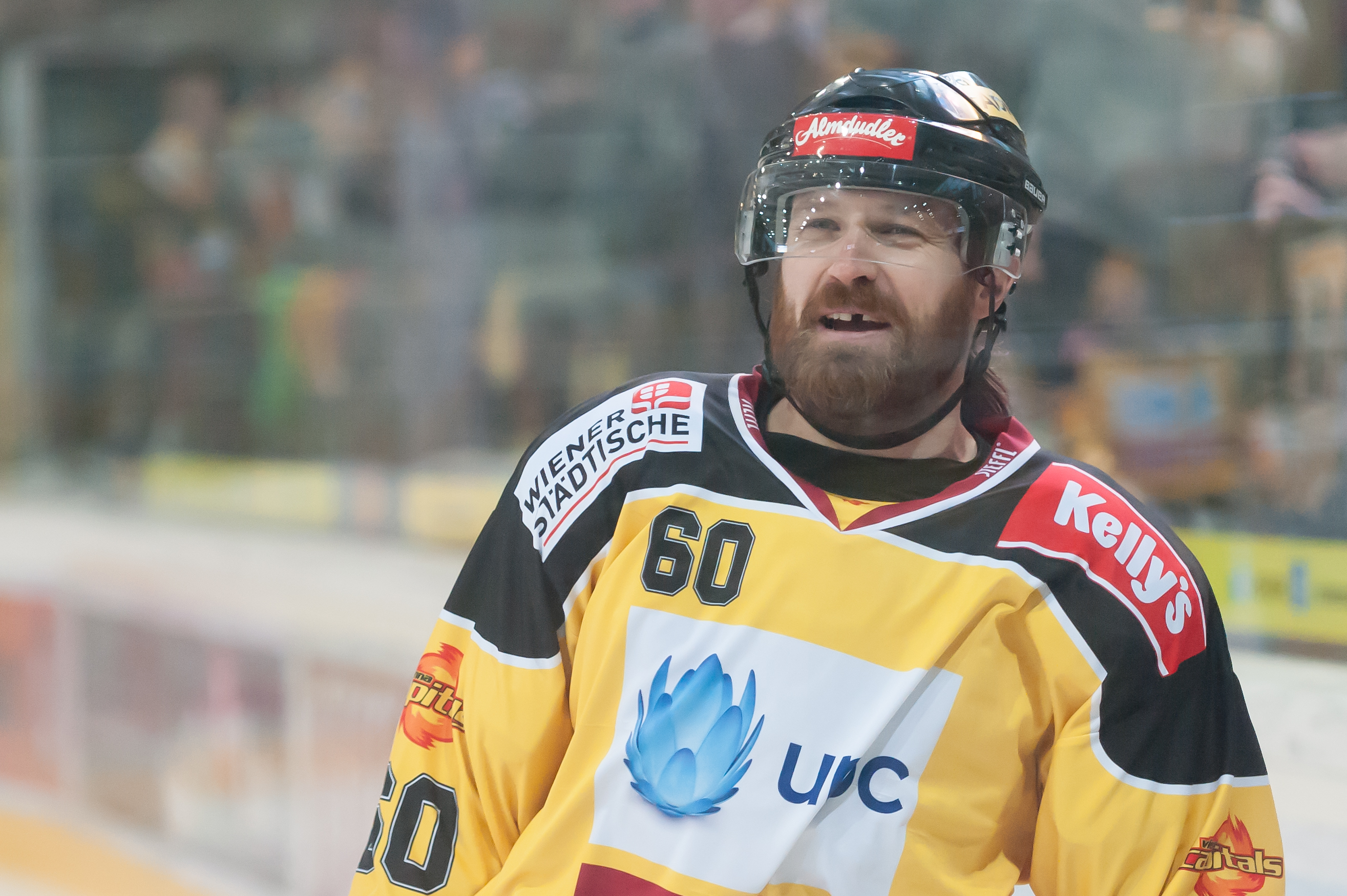
- Born: June 30, 1980 (age 45) Lake Orion, Michigan, U.S.
- Height: 6 ft 0 in (183 cm)
- Weight: 185 lb (84 kg; 13 st 3 lb)
- Position: Defense
- Shoots: Right
- AL team Former teams: Anyang Halla; Manchester Monarchs; San Antonio Rampage; Chicago Wolves; Hershey Bears; Ilves; Ässät Pori; Norfolk Admirals; HC Sparta Praha; EC Red Bull Salzburg; Vienna Capitals; Iserlohn Roosters; HK Nitra; High1
- NHL draft: Undrafted
- Playing career: 2003–present

Troy Milam (born June 30, 1980) is an American professional ice hockey defenseman who is currently playing for Anyang Halla of the Asia League Ice Hockey (ALIH).

== Playing career ==
Undrafted, Milam was a graduate of Ferris State University and Lake Orion High School. He played 4 years for Ferris State University, and also the Hershey Bears of the AHL and the Gwinnett Gladiators of the ECHL. While attending Ferris State Troy volunteered his time and services to help out local charities and children. Troy Milam remains a legend in the town of Big Rapids today.

On November 25, 2009, Milam belatedly signed for Ässät after an off-season rehab from an injury since last season whilst with Ives of the then Finnish SM-liiga.

Milam left HC Sparta Praha of the Czech Extraliga, signing with Austrian outfit, EC Red Bull Salzburg of the Austrian Hockey League on July 2, 2013.

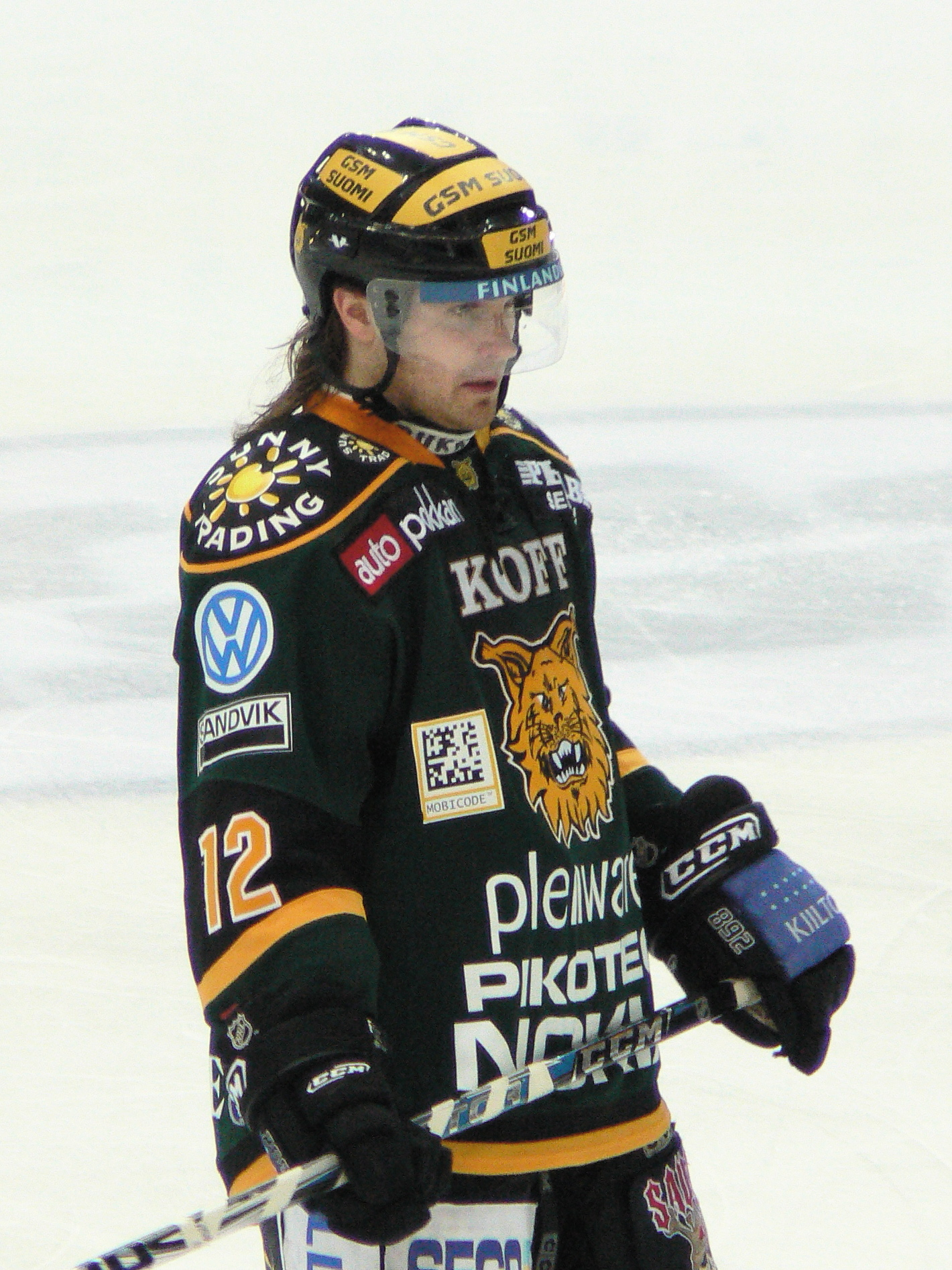
Troy Milam playing for Ilves in 2008.

After two successful seasons with Salzburg, Milam was opted to sign with Austrian rivals, the Vienna Capitals on June 5, 2015. He left the Capitals upon the conclusion of the 2015–16 season and headed to Germany, signing with the Iserlohn Roosters of the top-flight Deutsche Eishockey Liga (DEL) on June 18, 2016.

== Career statistics ==
			Regular season					Playoffs
Season	Team	League	GP	G	A	Pts	PIM	GP	G	A	Pts	PIM
1997–98	Detroit Compuware	NAHL	45	0	9	9	64	—	—	—	—	—
1998–99	Detroit Compuware	NAHL	55	6	32	38	108	—	—	—	—	—
1999–00	Ferris State	CCHA	39	6	13	19	62	—	—	—	—	—
2000–01	Ferris State	CCHA	38	4	7	11	58	—	—	—	—	—
2001–02	Ferris State	CCHA	36	4	13	17	57	—	—	—	—	—
2002–03	Ferris State	CCHA	42	7	25	32	40	—	—	—	—	—
2003–04	Gwinnett Gladiators	ECHL	60	6	27	33	44	10	0	5	5	6
2003–04	Manchester Monarchs	AHL	7	1	0	1	0	—	—	—	—	—
2003–04	San Antonio Rampage	AHL	13	0	2	2	10	—	—	—	—	—
2004–05	Manchester Monarchs	AHL	42	2	12	14	34	3	1	0	1	2
2004–05	Reading Royals	ECHL	19	0	10	10	8	—	—	—	—	—
2005–06	Gwinnett Gladiators	ECHL	48	7	41	48	49	17	4	11	15	24
2005–06	Chicago Wolves	AHL	2	0	0	0	2	—	—	—	—	—
2006–07	Chicago Wolves	AHL	31	4	17	21	24	—	—	—	—	—
2006–07	Hershey Bears	AHL	17	1	12	13	4	5	0	2	2	6
2007–08	Manchester Monarchs	AHL	75	12	25	37	64	4	1	1	2	0
2008–09	Ilves	SM-l	47	3	14	17	48	—	—	—	—	—
2009–10	Ässät	SM-l	32	3	5	8	34	—	—	—	—	—
2010–11	Norfolk Admirals	AHL	67	16	21	37	34	6	0	2	2	0
2011–12	HC Sparta Praha	ELH	52	8	13	21	48	5	0	2	2	6
2012–13	HC Sparta Praha	ELH	44	4	12	16	22	6	0	0	0	2
2013–14	EC Red Bull Salzburg	EBEL	54	7	25	32	36	14	2	3	5	16
2014–15	EC Red Bull Salzburg	EBEL	51	8	22	30	42	13	1	6	7	10
2015–16	Vienna Capitals	EBEL	54	12	24	36	60	2	0	1	1	0
2016–17	Iserlohn Roosters	DEL	52	6	24	30	22	—	—	—	—	—
2017–18	High1	AL	19	10	8	18	16	—	—	—	—	—
2017–18	HK Nitra	Slovak	12	1	3	4	8	8	0	3	3	4
2018–19	High1	AL	34	5	18	23	48	—	—	—	—	—
AHL totals			254	36	89	125	172	18	2	5	7	8

== Awards and honours ==
Award	Year
College
All-CCHA Second Team	2002–03
