= Petr Nedvěd =

Czech ice hockey player

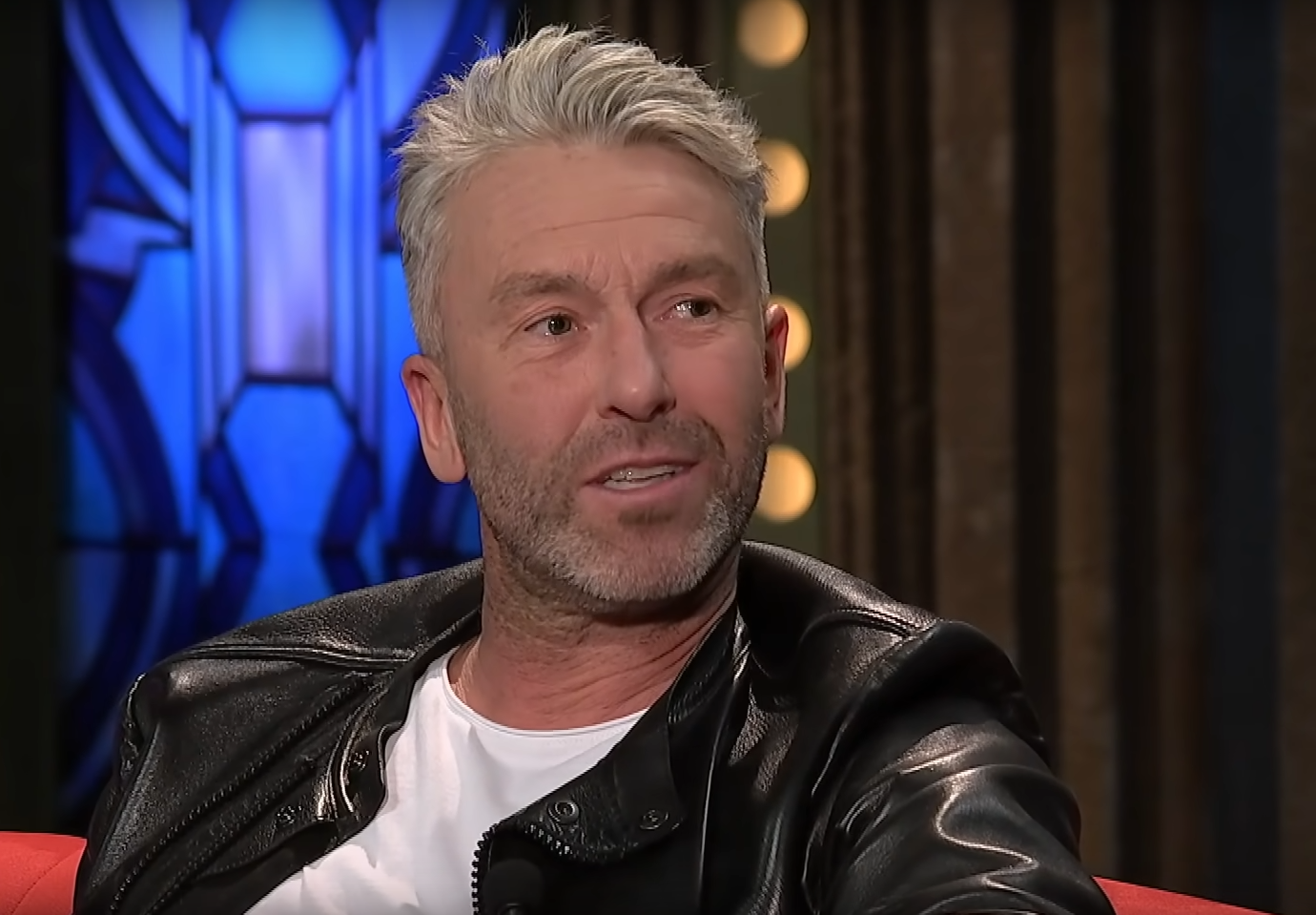
- Nedvěd in 2021
- Born: December 9, 1971 (age 54) Liberec, Czechoslovakia
- Height: 6 ft 3 in (191 cm)
- Weight: 196 lb (89 kg; 14 st 0 lb)
- Position: Centre
- Shot: Left
- Played for: Vancouver Canucks; St. Louis Blues; New York Rangers; Pittsburgh Penguins; HC Sparta Praha; Edmonton Oilers; Phoenix Coyotes; Philadelphia Flyers; HC Bílí Tygři Liberec
- National team: Canada and Czech Republic
- NHL draft: 2nd overall, 1990; Vancouver Canucks
- Playing career: 1990–2014, 2017–2018

Petr Nedvěd (born December 9, 1971) is a Czech-Canadian former professional ice hockey player who spent 15 seasons in the National Hockey League (NHL) between 1990 and 2007.

== Early career ==
Nedvěd was born in Liberec, Czechoslovakia to Jaroslav and Soňa ("Sonia") Nedvěd. On January 2, 1989, he fled the Czechoslovak Communist regime and defected as a political refugee at the age of 17 after playing in an international midget tournament in Calgary. At the tournament, Nedvěd scored 17 goals and nine assists.

== Playing career ==
After his defection, Nedvěd played one season for the Seattle Thunderbirds of the Western Hockey League and was drafted second overall by the Vancouver Canucks in the 1990 NHL entry draft after scoring 145 points in 71 games. In 1992–93, he finished with 38 goals and 71 points, including a club record 15-game point-scoring streak. Prior to the 1993–94 season, Nedvěd became involved in a contract dispute with the Canucks, which resulted in a holdout. While holding out, Nedvěd obtained his Canadian citizenship and represented Canada at the 1994 Winter Olympics, winning a silver medal. His situation was resolved just before the NHL trade deadline, when he was signed by the St. Louis Blues, with Craig Janney ultimately awarded to the Canucks as compensation (and then dealt back to the Blues shortly after for Jeff Brown, Bret Hedican and Nathan LaFayette). Nedvěd scored 20 points in 19 games, but the Blues were swept in the first round of the playoffs while the Canucks reached the Stanley Cup Final.

Nedvěd's was dealt to the New York Rangers for the lockout-shortened 1994–95 season. He finished the year with 23 points in 46 games. For the 1995–96 season, Nedvěd was traded again, this time to the Pittsburgh Penguins. In Pittsburgh, Nedvěd would have the best years of his career on an offensive team featuring Mario Lemieux, Jaromír Jágr, and Ron Francis. In his first year in Pittsburgh, he recorded career highs of 45 goals and 99 points, and scored 20 points as the Penguins reached the conference finals. Included in that was a goal against the Washington Capitals in quadruple overtime, which at 79:15 of overtime was at the time the longest NHL game in 60 years. During the 1996–97 season, he finished with 33 goals and 71 points.

Nedvěd missed the entire 1997–98 season due to another contract dispute and spent most of the year with lower-level teams in the Czech Republic. He remained unsigned at the start of the 1998–99 campaign, instead suiting up with the Las Vegas Thunder of the IHL. The situation ended two months into the season when he was dealt back to the New York Rangers in a deal involving Alexei Kovalev.

His holdout was ultimately disastrous for his career as he ended up with less money (once the millions of dollars he gave up by missing a season were factored in) than Pittsburgh's initial offer in 1997, while at the same time missing an extended portion of his career's prime years, which severely damaged his reputation around the league.

Nedvěd's second stint in New York would be more successful than the first, and the six seasons he spent with the Rangers represented the most stable portion of his career. Although the team missed the playoffs every year, Nedvěd led the Rangers in scoring twice and finished second on another occasion. In 2000–01, playing with Jan Hlaváč and Radek Dvořák – a trio dubbed the 'Czech Mates' – he had the second-best season of his career, finishing with 32 goals and 78 points. After the 2003–04 season, Nedvěd was dealt to the Edmonton Oilers at the trade deadline. Although Edmonton failed to make the playoffs, Nedvěd scored 15 points in 16 games.

Nedvěd signed with the Phoenix Coyotes in 2004 and spent the 2004–05 NHL lockout with HC Sparta Praha of the Czech Extraliga. Returning to NHL action in 2005–06 with the Coyotes, he scored just two goals and 11 points in 25 games. He was dealt to the Philadelphia Flyers, where he scored a further 14 points in 28 games and returned to the NHL playoffs for the first time since 1997.

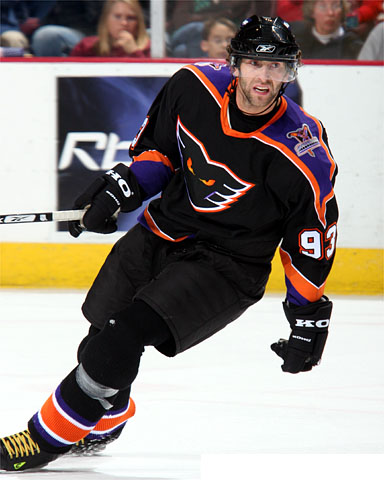
Nedvěd with the Philadelphia Phantoms in 2006

At the start of the 2006–07 season, Nedvěd was placed on waivers on October 18 following a 9–1 loss to the Buffalo Sabres, and was assigned to the American Hockey League (AHL) for the first time in his career. After bouncing between the NHL and AHL for the next two months, Nedvěd was claimed on re-entry waivers by the Edmonton Oilers. In Edmonton, he finished the season with just two goals and 12 points in 40 games between Edmonton and Philadelphia.

On July 19, 2007, Nedvěd signed a one-year contract to return to HC Sparta Praha. On July 31, 2008, Nedvěd, attempting to make an NHL comeback, was invited to the New York Rangers training camp on a tryout basis. He was released by the Rangers on September 26 and returned to the Extraliga, this time with his hometown HC Bílí Tygři Liberec.

On May 4, 2012, at age 40, Nedvěd returned to the Czech Republic national team in the 2012 IIHF World Championship hosted in Finland and Sweden. On May 10, 2012, Nedvěd became the oldest Team Czech Republic player to score a goal in World Championship. He scored game-winning goal against Latvia at the age of 40 years, 6 months and 1 day. On January 6, 2014, Nedvěd was named to the Czech team for the 2014 Sochi Olympics. He played in five games as the Czech Republic finished sixth. On March 13, 2014, Nedvěd played his last career game with Bílí Tygři Liberec in a 6–2 home loss against the HC Vítkovice Steel. He officially announced his retirement after the game.

== Awards ==
- 1989–90 – Jim Piggott Memorial Trophy Rookie of the Year (WHL)
- 1989–90 – Rookie of the Year (CHL)
- 1993–94 – silver medal (1994 Winter Olympics)
- 2011–12 – bronze medal (2012 IIHF World Championship)

== Personal life ==
Nedvěd married supermodel Veronika Vařeková in 2004. In early 2006, when playing for the Phoenix Coyotes, Nedvěd asked for a trade to an Eastern Conference team to be closer to Vařeková, who worked primarily in New York City. During the summer of 2006, Nedvěd and Vařeková separated. He has since moved back to the Czech Republic. His brother, defenceman Jaroslav Nedvěd, is also a former ice hockey player.

== Legacy ==
In the 2009 book 100 Ranger Greats, the authors ranked Nedvěd at No. 71 all-time of the 901 New York Rangers who had played during the team's first 82 seasons.

== Career statistics ==
Petr Nedvěd
Medal record

Men's ice hockey

Representing Canada

Olympic Games
Silver medal – second place	1994 Lillehammer	Ice hockey

Representing the Czech Republic

World Championships
Bronze medal – third place	2012 Helsinki	Ice hockey

=== Regular season and playoffs ===
			Regular season					Playoffs
Season	Team	League	GP	G	A	Pts	PIM	GP	G	A	Pts	PIM
1986–87	TJ CHZ Litvínov	CSSR U16	34	46	20	66	52	—	—	—	—	—
1987–88	TJ CHZ Litvínov	CSSR U16	35	67	27	94	64	—	—	—	—	—
1988–89	TJ CHZ Litvínov	CSSR U18	20	32	19	51	12	—	—	—	—	—
1989–90	Seattle Thunderbirds	WHL	71	65	80	145	80	11	4	9	13	2
1990–91	Vancouver Canucks	NHL	61	10	6	16	20	6	0	1	1	0
1991–92	Vancouver Canucks	NHL	77	15	22	37	36	10	1	4	5	16
1992–93	Vancouver Canucks	NHL	84	38	33	71	96	12	2	3	5	2
1993–94	Canada	Intl	25	24	13	37	22	—	—	—	—	—
1993–94	St. Louis Blues	NHL	19	6	14	20	8	4	0	1	1	4
1994–95	New York Rangers	NHL	46	11	12	23	26	10	3	2	5	6
1995–96	Pittsburgh Penguins	NHL	80	45	54	99	68	18	10	10	20	16
1996–97	Pittsburgh Penguins	NHL	74	33	38	71	66	5	1	2	3	12
1997–98	HC Sparta Prague	ELH	5	2	3	5	8	6	0	2	2	52
1997–98	HC Bílí Tygři Liberec	CZE II	2	0	3	3	—	—	—	—	—	—
1997–98	TJ Nový Jičín	CZE III	7	9	16	25	—	—	—	—	—	—
1997–98	Las Vegas Thunder	IHL	3	3	3	6	4	—	—	—	—	—
1998–99	New York Rangers	NHL	56	20	27	47	50	—	—	—	—	—
1998–99	Las Vegas Thunder	IHL	13	8	10	18	32	—	—	—	—	—
1999–2000	New York Rangers	NHL	76	24	44	68	40	—	—	—	—	—
2000–01	New York Rangers	NHL	79	32	46	78	54	—	—	—	—	—
2001–02	New York Rangers	NHL	78	21	25	46	36	—	—	—	—	—
2002–03	New York Rangers	NHL	78	27	31	58	64	—	—	—	—	—
2003–04	New York Rangers	NHL	65	14	17	31	42	—	—	—	—	—
2003–04	Edmonton Oilers	NHL	16	5	10	15	4	—	—	—	—	—
2004–05	HC Sparta Prague	ELH	46	22	13	35	44	5	2	3	5	10
2005–06	Phoenix Coyotes	NHL	25	2	9	11	34	—	—	—	—	—
2005–06	Philadelphia Flyers	NHL	28	5	9	14	36	6	2	0	2	8
2006–07	Philadelphia Flyers	NHL	21	1	6	7	18	—	—	—	—	—
2006–07	Philadelphia Phantoms	AHL	14	4	7	11	10	—	—	—	—	—
2006–07	Edmonton Oilers	NHL	19	1	4	5	10	—	—	—	—	—
2007–08	HC Sparta Prague	ELH	45	20	5	25	98	4	0	1	1	20
2008–09	Bílí Tygři Liberec	ELH	33	14	14	28	72	3	0	1	1	6
2009–10	Bílí Tygři Liberec	ELH	35	15	20	35	94	15	8	9	17	16
2010–11	Bílí Tygři Liberec	ELH	45	14	41	55	74	7	7	3	10	12
2011–12	Bílí Tygři Liberec	ELH	49	24	37	61	64	11	6	7	13	34
2012–13	Bílí Tygři Liberec	ELH	48	20	33	53	151	—	—	—	—	—
2013–14	Bílí Tygři Liberec	ELH	49	19	31	50	103	—	—	—	—	—
NHL totals			982	310	407	717	708	71	19	23	42	64
ELH totals			355	150	197	347	708	54	23	26	49	160

=== International ===
Year	Team	Event	GP	G	A	Pts	PIM
1994	Canada	OG	8	5	1	6	6
1996	Czech Republic	WCH	3	0	1	1	8
2012	Czech Republic	WC	9	3	2	5	2
2014	Czech Republic	OG	5	0	1	1	4
Senior totals			25	8	5	13	20

Preceded by Jason Herter	Vancouver Canucks first-round draft pick 1990	Succeeded by Shawn Antoski
