= Milan Kopecký =

Czech ice hockey player

- Born: May 11, 1981 (age 45) Prague, Czechoslovakia
- Height: 6 ft 0 in (183 cm)
- Weight: 183 lb (83 kg; 13 st 1 lb)
- Position: Center
- Shot: Left
- Played for: HC Slavia Praha; HC České Budějovice; HC Litvínov; HC Dukla Jihlava; Kiekko-Vantaa; HC Berounští Medvědi; IHC Písek
- National team: Czech Republic
- NHL draft: 287th overall, 2000; Philadelphia Flyers
- Playing career: 2000–2020

Milan Kopecký (born May 11, 1981) is a Czech former professional ice hockey player who played in the Czech Extraliga (ELH) for HC Slavia Praha, HC České Budějovice, and HC Litvínov. Kopecký was drafted in the ninth round of the 2000 NHL entry draft by the Philadelphia Flyers, but he has never played professionally in North America.

His elder brother Jan Kopecký also played the sport professionally.

== Career statistics ==
			Regular season					Playoffs
Season	Team	League	GP	G	A	Pts	PIM	GP	G	A	Pts	PIM
1998–99	HC Slavia Praha	CZE U20
1999–2000	HC Slavia Praha	CZE U20	36	17	7	24	24	7	5	3	8	0
1999–2000	HC Slavia Praha	ELH	2	0	0	0	0	—	—	—	—	—
2000–01	HC Slavia Praha	CZE U20	35	18	16	34	32	3	1	1	2	4
2000–01	HC Slavia Praha	ELH	10	1	0	1	0	—	—	—	—	—
2000–01	TJ SC Kolín	CZE.3	8	2	4	6	2	—	—	—	—	—
2001–02	HC Slavia Praha	CZE U20	3	2	0	2	4	—	—	—	—	—
2001–02	HC Berounští Medvědi	CZE.2	36	10	9	19	16	—	—	—	—	—
2001–02	HC Slavia Praha	ELH	—	—	—	—	—	1	0	0	0	0
2002–03	HC Slavia Praha	ELH	33	4	6	10	20	17	2	1	3	8
2002–03	HC Berounští Medvědi	CZE.2	7	2	4	6	6	—	—	—	—	—
2003–04	HC Slavia Praha	ELH	49	5	6	11	20	19	3	0	3	12
2004–05	HC Slavia Praha	ELH	52	6	4	10	24	7	0	0	0	4
2005–06	HC České Budějovice	ELH	28	1	4	5	20	—	—	—	—	—
2005–06	HC Slavia Praha	ELH	17	0	2	2	6	15	1	0	1	0
2006–07	HC Chemopetrol	ELH	52	7	5	12	30	—	—	—	—	—
2007–08	Anyang Halla	ALH	11	2	3	5	37	—	—	—	—	—
2007–08	BK Mladá Boleslav	CZE.2	9	0	1	1	8	—	—	—	—	—
2007–08	HC Dukla Jihlava	CZE.2	12	0	3	3	2	5	1	0	1	4
2008–09	Kiekko–Vantaa	Mestis	29	9	13	22	28	5	1	2	3	6
2009–10	HC Berounští Medvědi	CZE.2	5	1	1	2	6	—	—	—	—	—
2010–11	IHC KOMTERM Písek	CZE.2	10	0	1	1	4	—	—	—	—	—
2010–11	EV Moosburg	GER.5	8	7	13	20	2	—	—	—	—	—
2011–12	HC Bobři Valašské Meziříčí	CZE.3	20	8	6	14	20	—	—	—	—	—
2011–12	TSV Peißenberg	GER.4	16	16	6	22	10	6	4	1	5	8
2012–13	TSV Peißenberg	GER.4	26	17	13	30	47	7	3	4	7	10
2013–14	EA Schongau	GER.5	16	21	14	35	10	—	—	—	—	—
2014–15	EA Schongau	GER.5	22	23	34	57	12	—	—	—	—	—
2015–16	EA Schongau	GER.5	26	25	17	42	34	5	2	7	9	6
2016–17	EA Schongau	GER.4	24	13	11	24	20	—	—	—	—	—
2017–18	EA Schongau	GER.4	22	9	12	21	28	—	—	—	—	—
2018–19	EA Schongau	GER.4	25	17	15	32	34	—	—	—	—	—
2019–20	EA Schongau	GER.4	24	6	14	20	32	—	—	—	—	—
ELH totals			243	24	27	51	120	59	6	1	7	24
GER.4 totals			137	78	71	149	171	13	7	5	12	18
