= Ruslan Bernikov =

Russian ice hockey player (born 1977)

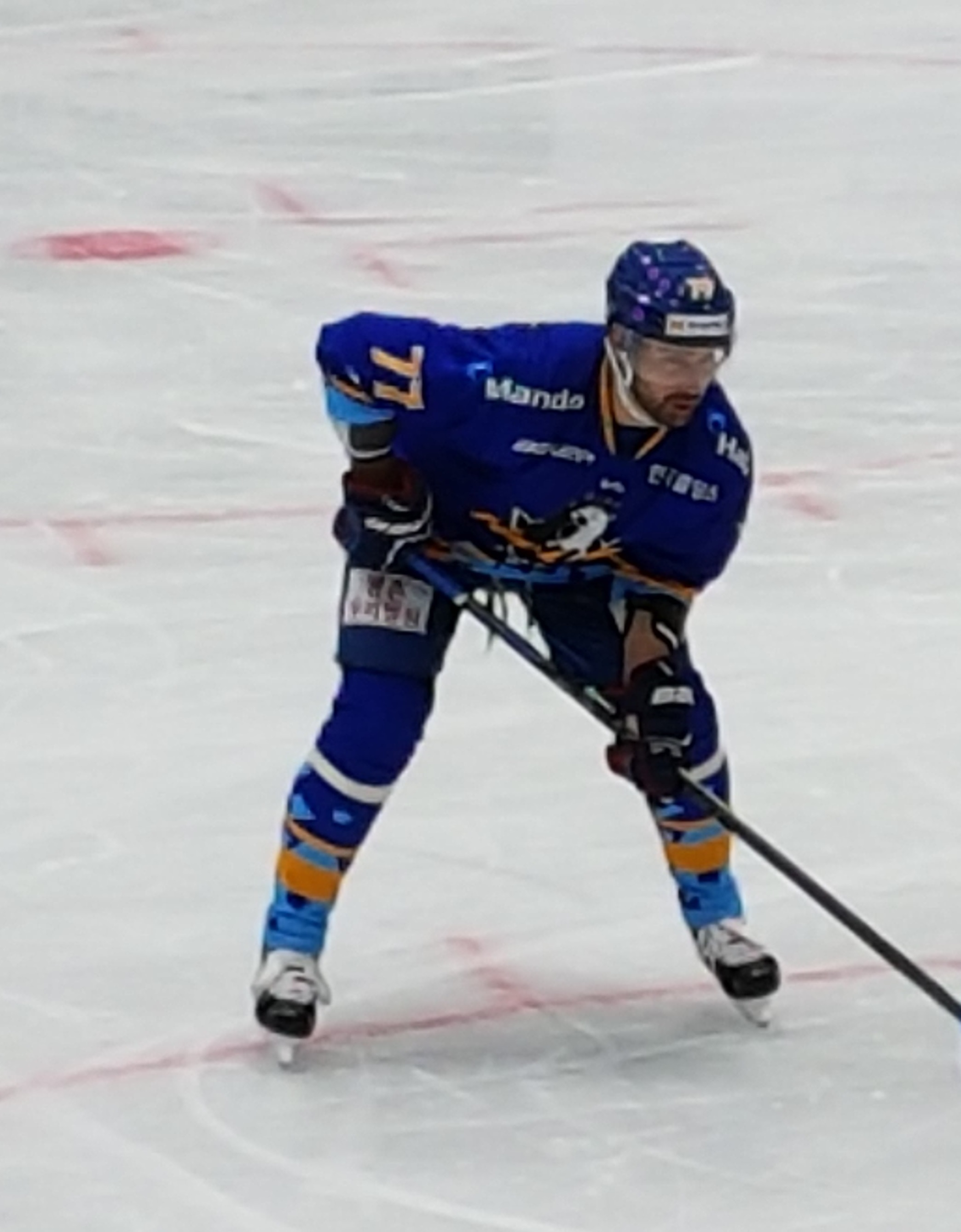
- Bernikov in 2017
- Born: December 4, 1977 (age 48) Domodedovo, Russian SSR, Soviet Union
- Height: 6 ft 3 in (191 cm)
- Weight: 216 lb (98 kg; 15 st 6 lb)
- Position: Right wing
- Shot: Left
- Played for: Dynamo Moscow; Dinamo-Energija Yekaterinburg; Krylya Sovetov Moscow; Severstal Cherepovets; CSKA Moscow; THK Tver; Amur Khabarovsk; Lada Togliatti; Ak Bars Kazan; Salavat Yulaev Ufa; Khimik Moscow Oblast; Sibir Novosibirsk; Neftekhimik Nizhnekamsk; Vityaz; Gazovik Tyumen; Torpedo Nizhny Novgorod; Kazzinc-Torpedo; Buran Voronezh; Sakhalin; Anyang Halla
- National team: Russia
- NHL draft: 139th overall, 2000; Dallas Stars
- Playing career: 1996–2018

Ruslan Viacheslavovich Bernikov (Russian: Руслан Вячеславович Берников; born December 4, 1977) is a Russian former professional ice hockey right winger.

== Career ==
Bernikov began his career with Dynamo Moscow in the Russian Superleague during the 1996–97 season, playing two games. He then spent a season with Dinamo-Energija Yekaterinburg before splitting the 1998–99 season with four different teams, playing one game for CSKA Moscow, six for Dynamo Moscow, twenty for Krylya Sovetov Moscow and five Severstal Cherepovets. The following season, he had another short spell with Dynamo, playing six games, before suiting up for Amur Khabarovsk for fourteen games. Bernikov was selected in the 5th round (139th overall) of the 2000 NHL entry draft by the Dallas Stars though he remained in Russia and never played in North America.

He would spend the next two seasons with Amur Khabarovsk before returning to Krylya Sovetov in 2002 for one season. In 2003, Bernikov joined Lada Togliatti. He then returned ro Severstal Cherepovets midway through the 2004–05 season before spending the following season with three different teams, Ak Bars Kazan, Khimik Moscow Oblast and Salavat Yulaev Ufa.

For the 2007–08 season, Bernikov joined Sibir Novosibirsk, but left mid-season and Neftekhimik Nizhnekamsk. It turned out to be the final season of the Superleague as it would be replaced by the Kontinental Hockey League. He would split the inaugural KHL season with Neftekhimik Nizhnekamsk and Vityaz. After a brief return with Amur Khabarovsk the following year where he played nine games, Bernikov played six games for Torpedo Nizhny Novgorod during the 2010–11 season, his 14th and last top-tier Russian team.

After spending the next three seasons in the second-tier Supreme Hockey League for Kazzinc-Torpedo and Buran Voronezh, Bernikov finished his career playing four seasons in Asia League Ice Hockey, three season with the Russian-based Sakhalin and one final season with the South Korean team Anyang Halla before retiring in 2018.

== Career statistics ==
			Regular season					Playoffs
Season	Team	League	GP	G	A	Pts	PIM	GP	G	A	Pts	PIM
1993–94	Dynamo–2 Moscow	RUS.3	7	0	1	1	0	—	—	—	—	—
1994–95	Dynamo–2 Moscow	RUS.2	44	7	6	13	15	—	—	—	—	—
1995–96	Dynamo–2 Moscow	RUS.2	33	11	1	12	18	—	—	—	—	—
1996–97	Dynamo Moscow	RSL	2	0	0	0	0	—	—	—	—	—
1996–97	Dynamo–2 Moscow	RUS.3	49	19	8	27	61	—	—	—	—	—
1997–98	Spartak Yekaterinburg	RSL	24	4	4	8	39	—	—	—	—	—
1997–98	Spartak–2 Yekaterinburg	RUS.3	2	1	1	2	0	—	—	—	—	—
1998–99	CSKA Moscow	RSL	1	0	0	0	0	—	—	—	—	—
1998–99	Dynamo Moscow	RSL	6	0	1	1	2	—	—	—	—	—
1998–99	Krylia Sovetov Moscow	RSL	20	3	1	4	24	—	—	—	—	—
1998–99	Severstal Cherepovets	RSL	5	0	2	2	0	1	0	0	0	0
1999–2000	Dynamo Moscow	RSL	6	2	2	4	2	—	—	—	—	—
1999–2000	THK Tver	RUS.2	6	0	0	0	2	—	—	—	—	—
1999–2000	Amur Khabarovsk	RSL	14	3	6	9	10	5	3	1	4	2
1999–2000	Amur–2 Khabarovsk	RUS.3	1	0	0	0	2	—	—	—	—	—
2000–01	Amur Khabarovsk	RSL	34	1	4	5	40	—	—	—	—	—
2000–01	Amur–2 Khabarovsk	RUS.3	5	2	0	2	0	—	—	—	—	—
2001–02	Amur Khabarovsk	RSL	41	7	10	17	20	—	—	—	—	—
2002–03	Krylia Sovetov Moscow	RSL	50	15	10	25	40	—	—	—	—	—
2002–03	Krylia Sovetov–2 Moscow	RUS.3	3	1	2	3	0	—	—	—	—	—
2003–04	Lada Togliatti	RSL	49	8	10	18	51	6	0	0	0	4
2004–05	Lada Togliatti	RSL	16	3	1	4	14	—	—	—	—	—
2004–05	Lada–2 Togliatti	RUS.3	1	0	0	0	2	—	—	—	—	—
2004–05	Severstal Cherepovets	RSL	33	9	6	15	8	—	—	—	—	—
2004–05	Severstal–2 Cherepovets	RUS.3	1	0	1	1	0	—	—	—	—	—
2005–06	Ak Bars Kazan	RSL	5	0	0	0	0	—	—	—	—	—
2005–06	Khimik Moscow Oblast	RSL	21	2	3	5	40	—	—	—	—	—
2005–06	Salavat Yulaev Ufa	RSL	16	3	2	5	26	6	1	0	1	4
2006–07	Salavat Yulaev Ufa	RSL	32	6	3	9	14	5	1	1	2	6
2006–07	Salavat Yulaev–2 Ufa	RUS.3	5	4	3	7	28	—	—	—	—	—
2007–08	Sibir Novosibirsk	RSL	20	3	4	7	16	—	—	—	—	—
2007–08	Neftekhimik Nizhnekamsk	RSL	27	8	3	11	34	5	1	2	3	2
2008–09	Neftekhimik Nizhnekamsk	KHL	16	1	2	3	39	—	—	—	—	—
2008–09	HC Vityaz	KHL	10	0	2	2	4	—	—	—	—	—
2008–09	Vityaz–2 Chekhov	RUS.3	3	1	2	3	0	—	—	—	—	—
2009–10	Krylia Sovetov Moscow	RUS.2	18	9	11	20	10	—	—	—	—	—
2009–10	Gazovik Tyumen	RUS.2	4	2	1	3	4	4	0	0	0	0
2009–10	Amur Khabarovsk	KHL	9	0	1	1	4	—	—	—	—	—
2010–11	Krylia Sovetov Moscow	VHL	35	16	17	33	30	—	—	—	—	—
2010–11	Torpedo Nizhny Novgorod	KHL	6	1	0	1	14	—	—	—	—	—
2011–12	Kazzinc–Torpedo	VHL	52	11	23	34	83	5	2	1	3	0
2012–13	Buran Voronezh	VHL	37	11	13	24	32	16	5	7	12	18
2013–14	Buran Voronezh	VHL	45	8	13	21	40	11	1	9	10	29
2014–15	PSK Sakhalin	ALH	48	30	45	75	36	4	2	4	6	4
2015–16	PSK Sakhalin	ALH	48	28	37	65	42	8	6	5	11	2
2016–17	PSK Sakhalin	ALH	48	36	31	67	50	7	1	5	6	2
2017–18	Anyang Halla	ALH	25	8	11	19	18	8	1	0	1	4
RUS.2 & VHL totals			274	75	85	160	234	36	8	17	25	47
RSL totals			422	77	72	149	380	28	6	4	10	18
ALH totals			169	102	124	226	146	27	10	14	24	12
