= Korea National Ice Hockey Championship =

The Korea National Ice Hockey Championship (Korean: 전국종합아이스하키선수권대회) is an annual ice hockey tournament played in South Korea. Any team from South Korea could participate, as long as it is a member of the Korea Ice Hockey Association. The inaugural edition was held in 1946.

== Champions ==
The Korean Air Force team plays against Yonsei University for the 9th Korean Championship

Korea National Ice Hockey Championship winners
Edition	Year	Champions	Ref.
6	1954	Housing Corporation	
7	1955	Jeon-hwui-mun team	
9	1957	Korean Air Force	
10	1958	Whimoon Club	
11	1959	Whimoon Club and Kwangsung High School (co-champions)	
12	1960	Whimoon Club	
	1961	Kyunggi Club and Kwangsung High School (co-champions)	
15	1963	Jeon-gwang-seong team	
16	1964	Yonsei University	
	1966	Kyung Hee University	
19	1967	Kyung Hee University	
20	1968	Yonsei University	
21	1969	Korean Army team	
22	1970	Kyung Hee University	
23	1971	Korea University	
24	1972	Korea University	
25	1973	Korea University	
	1976	Kyung Hee University	
	1977	Kyung Hee University	
30	1978	Kyung Hee University	
33	1981 (January)	Korea University	
36	1981 (December)	Yonsei University	
37	1982	Korea University	
38	1983	Korea University	
39	1984	Korea University	
40	1985	Korea University	
41	1986	Yonsei University	
42	1987	Hanyang University	
43	1988	Yonsei University	
44	1989	Yonsei University	
45	1990	Yonsei University	
46	1991	Hanyang University	
47	1992	Yonsei University	
48	1993	Yonsei University	
49	1994	Seoktap	
50	1995	Yonsei University	
51	1996	Mando Winia	
52	1997	Mando Winia	
53	1998	Yonsei University	
54	1999	Halla Winia	
55	2000	Halla Winia	
56	2001	Dongwon Dreams	
57	2002	Dongwon Dreams	
58	2003	Korea University	
59	2004	Yonsei University	
60	2005	Halla Winia	
61	2006	Kangwon Land	
62	2007	High1	
63	2008	High1	
64	2009	Anyang Halla	
65	2010	Anyang Halla	
66	2011	High1	
67	2012	High1	
68	2013	Daemyung Sangmu	
69	2014	Anyang Halla	
70	2015	High1	
71	2016	Anyang Halla	
72	2017	Daemyung Killer Whales	
73	2018	High1	
74	2019	Daemyung Killer Whales	
75	2021	Anyang Halla	
76	2022	Anyang Halla	
77	2023	HL Anyang	
78	2024	HL Anyang	
