= Daemyung Killer Whales =

- City: Seoul, South Korea
- League: Asia League Ice Hockey (2016–2020)
- Founded: 2016; 10 years ago
- Folded: 2021; 5 years ago
- Home arena: Mokdong Ice Rink
- Colors: Red, white, blue

The Daemyung Killer Whales were a professional ice hockey team based in Seoul, South Korea. The club joined the Asia League Ice Hockey in the 2016–17 season.

== Honours ==
- Korea National Ice Hockey Championship

Winners (2): 2017, 2019

== Season-by-season record ==
=== Asia League ===
Season	GP	W	W (OT)	W (pen)	L (pen)	L (OT)	L	GF	GA	Pts.	Finish	Playoffs
2016–17	48	7	1	0	1	2	37	107	231	26	8th of 9	Did not qualify
2017–18	28	8	2	2	2	3	11	72	88	37	6th of 8	Did not qualify
2018–19	34	19	1	0	3	2	9	81	60	64	1st of 8	Semifinals
2019–20	36	14	1	1	1	1	18	86	113	48	4th of 7	Semifinals
Totals	146	48	5	3	7	8	75	346	492	175	—	—
