= Patrik Hučko =

Czech ice hockey defencemen

- Born: January 6, 1973 (age 53) Uherské Hradiště, Czechoslovakia
- Height: 6 ft 3 in (191 cm)
- Weight: 203 lb (92 kg; 14 st 7 lb)
- Position: Defence
- Shot: Right
- Played for: HC Zlín; HC Železárny Třinec; HC Slezan Opava; Starbulls Rosenheim; HIFK; HC České Budějovice; EHC Linz; HC Neftekhimik Nizhnekamsk; Leksands IF; HC Lasselsberger Plzeň; Anyang Halla; Totempo HvIK; HK 32 Liptovský Mikuláš
- Playing career: 1991–2013

Patrik Hučko (born January 6, 1973) is a Czech former professional ice hockey defenceman.

Hučko played in the Czech Extraliga for HC Zlín, HC Železárny Třinec, HC Slezan Opava, HC České Budějovice and HC Lasselsberger Plzeň. He won a league championship with Zlín in 2004.

He also played in the Deutsche Eishockey Liga for Starbulls Rosenheim, the SM-liiga for HIFK, the Russian Superleague for HC Neftekhimik Nizhnekamsk and the Elitserien for Leksands IF.
