= Korean Ice Hockey League =

National ice hockey league of South Korea (1995–2004)

The Korean Ice Hockey League (KIHL) was the national ice hockey league in South Korea from the 1995–96 season until it folded after the 2003–04 season. Anyang Halla (known as Mando Winia from 1994–1997 and Halla Winia from 1998–2004) won the league title five times.

== Winners ==
- 1995–96 Seoktap Construction
- 1996–97 Yonsei University
- 1997–98 Halla Winia
- 1998–99 Yonsei University
- 1999–00 Halla Winia
- 2000–01 Hyundai Oilbankers
- 2001–02 Halla Winia
- 2002–03 Halla Winia
- 2003–04 Halla Winia
