= Jiří Veber =

Czech ice hockey player

Personal information
- Nationality: Czech
- Born: 29 November 1968 (age 56) Prague, Czechoslovakia

Sport
- Sport: Ice hockey

Jiří Veber (born 29 November 1968) is a Czech former ice hockey player. He competed in the men's tournament at the 1994 Winter Olympics.

== Career statistics ==
=== Regular season and playoffs ===
			Regular season					Playoffs
Season	Team	League	GP	G	A	Pts	PIM	GP	G	A	Pts	PIM
1985–86	Poldi SONP Kladno	TCH U20	35	8	7	15		—	—	—	—	—
1986–87	Poldi SONP Kladno	TCH U20		7	23	30		—	—	—	—	—
1986–87	Poldi SONP Kladno	CZE.2	6	0	3	3	8	—	—	—	—	—
1987–88	Poldi SONP Kladno	TCH	—	—	—	—	—	8	0	0	0	6
1990–91	Poldi SONP Kladno	TCH	21	0	0	0	2	—	—	—	—	—
1991–92	Poldi SONP Kladno	TCH	38	4	10	14	71	8	1	1	2	10
1992–93	Poldi SONP Kladno	TCH	39	4	7	11	85	—	—	—	—	—
1993–94	Poldi SONP Kladno	ELH	43	6	6	12	38	11	1	3	4	16
1994–95	Ässät	SM-l	28	1	3	4	55	—	—	—	—	—
1994–95	Tappara	SM-l	18	1	3	4	8	—	—	—	—	—
1995–96	HC Dadák Vsetín	ELH	38	5	8	13	55	13	7	4	11	24
1996–97	HC Petra Vsetín	ELH	48	5	19	24	46	10	0	3	3	10
1997–98	HC Petra Vsetín	ELH	32	3	11	14	20	10	3	4	7	6
1998–99	HC Slovnaft Vsetín	ELH	48	7	3	10	48	9	0	3	3	14
1999–2000	HC Slovnaft Vsetín	ELH	16	1	4	5	6	—	—	—	—	—
1999–2000	Blues	SM-l	15	0	2	2	2	3	0	0	0	0
2000–01	SERC Wild Wings	DEL	57	4	18	22	60	—	—	—	—	—
2001–02	HC Keramika Plzeň	ELH	38	0	5	5	36	5	0	0	0	6
2002–03	Molot-Prikamye Perm	RSL	45	5	3	8	48	—	—	—	—	—
2003–04	HC Chemopetrol, a.s.	ELH	10	0	1	1	6	—	—	—	—	—
2003–04	HC Berounští Medvědi	CZE.2	15	1	2	3	12	—	—	—	—	—
2004–05	HC Berounští Medvědi	CZE.2	46	1	8	9	68	3	0	0	0	6
TCH totals			98	8	16	24	158	16	1	1	2	16
ELH totals			273	27	58	85	255	58	11	17	28	76

=== International ===
Year	Team	Event	GP	G	A	Pts	PIM
1994	Czech Republic	OG	2	0	0	0	2
1996	Czech Republic	WC	8	0	1	1	8
1996	Czech Republic	WCH	2	0	0	0	0
1997	Czech Republic	WC	2	0	0	0	0
1998	Czech Republic	WC	9	0	1	1	6
Senior totals			23	0	2	2	16

"Jiri Veber". Elite Prospects.
