= 2010–11 Asia League Ice Hockey season =

The 2010–11 Asia League Ice Hockey season was the eighth season of Asia League Ice Hockey. Seven teams participated in the league. The Tohoku Free Blades and Anyang Halla were named co-champions due to the Japan earthquake.

== Regular season ==
	Club	GP	W	OTW	SOW	SOL	OTL	L	GF	GA	Pts
1.	Oji Eagles	36	21	3	2	3	0	7	161	91	76
2.	Nippon Paper Cranes	36	21	2	1	3	2	7	141	95	74
3.	Tohoku Free Blades	36	18	1	3	2	4	8	160	112	68
4.	Anyang Halla	36	17	4	2	1	3	9	130	94	67
5.	High1	36	15	1	1	0	2	17	131	112	51
6.	Nikkō Ice Bucks	36	10	3	1	0	2	20	95	112	40
7.	China Dragon	36	0	0	0	1	1	34	46	248	2

== Playoffs ==
Semifinals
2	Nippon Paper Cranes	1
3	Tohoku Free Blades	3
1	Oji Eagles	1
4	Anyang Halla	3

Final
3	Tohoku Free Blades	n/a
4	Anyang Halla	n/a

The finals were canceled due to the earthquake in Tohoku. Tohoku Free Blades and Anyang Halla were co-champions for 2010–11 Asia League Ice Hockey season.
