= 2009–10 Asia League Ice Hockey season =

The 2009–10 Asia League Ice Hockey season was the seventh season of Asia League Ice Hockey. Seven teams participated in the league, and Anyang Halla won the championship.

== Regular season ==
	Club	GP	W	OTW	SOW	SOL	OTL	L	GF	GA	Pts
1.	Anyang Halla	36	23	2	1	3	1	6	180	109	79
2.	Oji Eagles	36	21	0	3	2	3	7	141	80	74
3.	Nippon Paper Cranes	36	18	3	3	2	0	10	128	101	68
4.	High1	36	17	2	0	2	3	12	150	130	60
5.	Tohoku Free Blades	36	13	0	4	1	0	18	132	142	48
6.	Nikkō Ice Bucks	36	12	2	1	2	2	17	103	118	46
7.	China Dragon	36	1	0	0	0	0	35	64	218	3

== Playoffs ==
Semifinals
1	Anyang Halla	3
4	High1	1
2	Oji Eagles	1
3	Nippon Paper Cranes	3

Final
1	Anyang Halla	3
3	Nippon Paper Cranes	2
