= Philippines at the 2025 Asian Winter Games =

- Flag of the Philippines
- IOC code: PHI
- NOC: Philippine Olympic Committee
- Website: www.olympic.ph

in Harbin, China 7 February 2025 – 14 February 2025
- Competitors: 19 in 5 sports
- Flag bearers: Peter Groseclose & Kathleen Dubberstein
- Medals Ranked =5th: Gold 1 Silver 0 Bronze 0 Total 1

Asian Winter Games appearances
- 1990; 1996–2003; 2007; 2011; 2017; 2025; 2029

The Philippines competed at the 2025 Asian Winter Games in Harbin, China, from 7 to 14 February. The curling event began on 4 February, ahead of the opening ceremony. There were 19 competing athletes for the country in five sports. The Filipino flagbearers for the opening ceremony were Kathleen Dubberstein (curling) and Peter Groseclose (speedskating)

Their best performance was in men's curling, where they won the first ever Asian Winter Games medal for the nation, after beating South Korea in the gold medal final.

== Background ==
The Philippines are among the tropical nations competing at the 2025 Asian Winter Games. They debuted at the games in 1990 with alpine skier Michael Teruel.

Richard Lim of Karate Pilipinas leads the delegation. The team was supposed to consist of 20 athletes competing in six sports, but the sole snowboarder got injured reducing the delegation to 19 athletes and five sports.

Short track speed skater Peter Groseclose and curler Kathleen Dubberstein were the country's flagbearers for the opening ceremony.

In this edition, the Philippines won their first ever Winter Asian Games medal on 14 February – a gold in the curling men's team tournament. It is also the first gold medal ever for a Southeast Asian nation. However this is not the first medal from Southeast Asia, that distinction belongs to freeskier Paul Vieuxtemps of Thailand who won a bronze on 11 February.

== Medal summary ==
Medalists

Medal	Name	Sport	Event	Date
Gold	Marc Pfister; Christian Haller; Enrico Pfister; Alan Frei; Benjo Delarmente	Curling	Men's team	14 February

== Competitors ==
The following table lists the Filipino delegation per sport and gender. A male snowboarder was also originally included but withdrew due to an injury.

Sport	Men	Women	Total
Alpine skiing	1	1	2
Curling	5	5	10
Figure skating	2	3	5
Freestyle skiing	—N/a	1	1
Short-track speed skating	1	—N/a	1
Total	9	10	19

== Schedule ==
The following was the schedule of the Philippine delegation.

OC	Opening ceremony	●	Event competitions	1	Event finals	~~1~~	Event finals (athlete/s failed to advance)	CC	Closing ceremony

Event/Date→	February 2025											Events
Event/Date→	4 Tue	5 Wed	6 Thu	7 Fri	8 Sat	9 Sun	10 Mon	11 Tue	12 Wed	13 Thu	14 Fri	Events
Ceremonies				OC							CC	
Alpine skiing					1	1						2
Curling	●	●	●	●	1	●	●	●	●	●	2	3
Figure skating								●	1	2		3
Freestyle skiing								1	1			2
Short-track speed skating				●	●	~~2~~	~~1~~					3
Total events	0				2	3	1	1	2	2	13	13
Cumulative total	0				2	5	6	7	9	11	13	

== Alpine skiing ==
Tallulah Proulx finished 16th overall after her two runs in the women's slalom. Francis Ceccarelli got disqualified in the first run after he went out of the slalom line while trying to speed down.

Athlete	Event	Run 1		Run 2		Total	
Athlete	Event	Time	Rank	Time	Rank	Time	Rank
Francis Ceccarelli	Men's slalom	DSQ					
Tallulah Proulx	Women's slalom	58.24	20	55.18	14	1:53.42	16

== Curling ==
The Philippines entered all three events: mixed doubles, men's and women's teams. Ten curlers represented the country. This marks the first time that curlers have competed for the Philippines at the Asian Winter Games, with the national federation Curling Pilipinas only being formed in 2023.

Summary

Team	Event	Group stage									Qualification	Semifinal	Final / BM	
Team	Event	Opposition Score	Opposition Score	Opposition Score	Opposition Score	Opposition Score	Opposition Score	Opposition Score	Opposition Score	Rank	Opposition Score	Opposition Score	Opposition Score	Rank
Marc Pfister; Christian Haller; Enrico Pfister; Alan Frei; Benjo Delarmente	Men's team	South Korea; L 1–6	Kazakhstan; W 4–1	Kyrgyzstan; W 12–2	Chinese Taipei; W 11–3	—N/a				2 Q	Japan; W 10–4	China; W 7–6	South Korea; W 5–3	1st place, gold medalist(s)
Kathleen Dubberstein; Leilani Dubberstein; Sheila Mariano; Anne Marie Bonache; Jennifer de la Fuente	Women's team	Hong Kong; W 7–2	Qatar; W 13–1	Japan; L 4–6	Kazakhstan; L 4–5	Thailand; W 16–0	China; L 5–9	South Korea; L 3–11	Chinese Taipei; W 9–2	5	Did not advance			5
Kathleen Dubberstein; Marc Pfister	Mixed doubles	South Korea; W 12–6	Kyrgyzstan; W 10–2	Qatar; W 11–3	China; L 6–9	Kazakhstan; W 11–2	—N/a			2 Q	Chinese Taipei; W 7–2	Japan; L 3–10	China; L 5–6	4

=== Men's tournament ===
The Philippines entered a men's team which is skipped by Marc Pfister.

They lost their opening game to South Korea in the round round robin phase. They won over their other group opposition: Kazakhstan, Kyrgyzstan and Chinese Taipei.

They advanced to the playoff, defeating Japan and host China in the qualification game and semifinal, respectively. In the gold medal match, the Philippines won 5–3 over South Korea. The Koreans took the final shot and were attempting to dislodge one of the yellow stones in a bid to score two points to win the gold but failed. This is the first ever Winter Asian Games medal for the Philippines.

Round robin

Pos	Team	Skip	Pld	W	L	W–L	PF	PA	DSC	Qualification
1	South Korea	Lee Jae-beom	4	4	0	—	43	5	83.43	Semifinals
2	Philippines	Marc Pfister	4	3	1	—	28	12	78.11	Qualification
3	Kazakhstan	Abylaikhan Zhuzbay	4	2	2	—	19	24	73.49	Qualification
4	Chinese Taipei	Lin Ting-li	4	1	3	—	16	35	108.93	
5	Kyrgyzstan	Aibek Asanaliev	4	0	4	—	10	40	77.01	

Source: Official website

Draw 1

Sunday, 9 February, 13:00

Sheet A	1	2	3	4	5	6	7	8	Final
South Korea 🔨	0	2	0	1	2	0	1	X	6
Philippines	0	0	0	0	0	1	0	X	1

Draw 3

Monday, 10 February, 9:00

Sheet D	1	2	3	4	5	6	7	8	Final
Kazakhstan	0	0	0	1	0	0	0	X	1
Philippines 🔨	0	0	2	0	0	0	2	X	4

Draw 5

Monday, 10 February, 19:00

Sheet E	1	2	3	4	5	6	7	8	Final
Philippines 🔨	2	0	5	0	4	1	X	X	12
Kyrgyzstan	0	1	0	1	0	0	X	X	2

Draw 8

Wednesday, 12 February, 14:00

Sheet C	1	2	3	4	5	6	7	8	Final
Philippines 🔨	4	2	0	3	0	2	X	X	11
Chinese Taipei	0	0	1	0	2	0	X	X	3

Qualification

Thursday, 13 February, 14:00

Sheet B	1	2	3	4	5	6	7	8	Final
Japan	1	0	2	0	1	0	0	X	4
Philippines 🔨	0	2	0	2	0	2	4	X	10

Semifinal

Thursday, 13 February, 19:00

Sheet E	1	2	3	4	5	6	7	8	Final
Philippines	0	0	1	0	4	1	0	1	7
China 🔨	0	2	0	2	0	0	2	0	6

Gold Medal Game

Thursday, 14 February, 9:00

Sheet B	1	2	3	4	5	6	7	8	Final
South Korea 🔨	0	0	1	0	1	1	0	0	3
Philippines	0	1	0	2	0	0	1	1	5

=== Women's tournament ===
The Philippines entered a women's team skipped by Kathleen Dubberstein.

Round robin

Pos	Team	Skip	Pld	W	L	W–L	PF	PA	DSC	Qualification
1	South Korea	Gim Eun-ji	8	8	0	—	63	14	45.90	Semifinals
2	China	Wang Rui	8	7	1	—	85	21	38.69	Semifinals
3	Japan	Yuina Miura	8	6	2	—	68	30	58.25	Semifinals
4	Kazakhstan	Angelina Ebauyer	8	5	3	—	55	39	54.81	Semifinals
5	Philippines	Kathleen Dubberstein	8	4	4	—	61	36	85.56	
6	Hong Kong	Hung Ling Yue	8	3	5	—	44	45	115.69	
7	Chinese Taipei	Yang Ko	8	2	6	—	29	75	107.27	
8	Thailand	Phichayathida Jaosap	8	1	7	—	19	91	128.48	
9	Qatar	Amna Al-Qaet	8	0	8	—	11	84	180.65	

Source: Official website

Draw 1

Sunday, 9 February, 9:00

Sheet B	1	2	3	4	5	6	7	8	Final
Philippines 🔨	1	1	3	1	0	1	0	X	7
Hong Kong	0	0	0	0	1	0	1	X	2

Draw 2

Sunday, 9 February, 17:00

Sheet C	1	2	3	4	5	6	7	8	Final
Qatar	0	0	0	1	0	0	X	X	1
Philippines 🔨	0	5	2	0	5	1	X	X	13

Draw 3

Monday, 10 February, 9:00

Sheet A	1	2	3	4	5	6	7	8	Final
Japan 🔨	1	0	0	2	1	1	1	X	6
Philippines	0	2	2	0	0	0	0	X	4

Draw 5

Tuesday, 11 February, 9:00

Sheet B	1	2	3	4	5	6	7	8	Final
Kazakhstan 🔨	0	2	0	1	1	0	0	1	5
Philippines	1	0	1	0	0	1	1	0	4

Draw 6

Tuesday, 11 February, 19:00

Sheet D	1	2	3	4	5	6	7	8	Final
Philippines 🔨	1	2	5	2	1	5	X	X	16
Thailand	0	0	0	0	0	0	X	X	0

Draw 7

Wednesday, 12 February, 9:00

Sheet E	1	2	3	4	5	6	7	8	Final
Philippines	0	1	0	2	0	1	1	X	5
China 🔨	3	0	2	0	4	0	0	X	9

Draw 8

Wednesday, 12 February, 19:00

Sheet C	1	2	3	4	5	6	7	8	Final
Philippines	0	2	0	0	1	0	X	X	3
South Korea 🔨	2	0	4	3	0	2	X	X	11

Draw 9

Thursday, 13 February, 9:00

Sheet D	1	2	3	4	5	6	7	8	Final
Chinese Taipei	0	0	1	0	1	0	0	X	2
Philippines 🔨	2	2	0	3	0	1	1	X	9

=== Mixed doubles tournament ===
The Philippines entered a mixed doubles pair consisting of Marc Pfister and Kathleen Dubberstein. Prior to this tournament, the two have played mixed doubles together for six or seven times. They started their campaign with an upset of world rank no. 13 South Korea. With wins over Kyrgyzstan and Qatar and despite a loss to China, the Philippines was assured a spot in the qualification play-off. They lost to Japan in the semifinal, and their rematch against China in the bronze medal game ended in a close defeat to finish fourth.

Round robin

Pos	Team	Athletes	Pld	W	L	W–L	PF	PA	DSC	Qualification
1	China	Han / Wang	5	5	0	—	44	19	37.46	Semifinals
2	Philippines	Dubberstein / Pfister	5	4	1	—	50	22	58.24	Qualification
3	South Korea	Kim / Seong	5	3	2	—	50	22	47.83	Qualification
4	Kazakhstan	Seitzhanova / Nadirbayev	5	2	3	—	26	43	55.33	
5	Kyrgyzstan	Asanbaeva / Abykeev	5	1	4	—	21	50	114.23	
6	Qatar	Al-Abdulla / Al-Yafei	5	0	5	—	15	50	98.31	

Source: Official website

Draw 1

Tuesday, 4 February, 10:00

Sheet D	1	2	3	4	5	6	7	8	Final
Philippines	5	0	2	0	0	0	5	X	12
South Korea 🔨	0	1	0	1	3	1	0	X	6

Draw 2

Tuesday, 4 February, 14:00

Sheet A	1	2	3	4	5	6	7	8	Final
Kyrgyzstan	0	0	1	0	0	1	0	X	2
Philippines 🔨	3	1	0	1	1	0	4	X	10

Draw 3

Wednesday, 5 February, 10:00

Sheet C	1	2	3	4	5	6	7	8	Final
Philippines 🔨	0	3	3	1	3	1	X	X	11
Qatar	3	0	0	0	0	0	X	X	3

Draw 5

Wednesday, 5 February, 18:00

Sheet E	1	2	3	4	5	6	7	8	Final
China 🔨	4	2	1	1	0	1	0	X	9
Philippines	0	0	0	0	3	0	3	X	6

Draw 8

Thursday, 6 February, 18:00

Sheet B	1	2	3	4	5	6	7	8	Final
Philippines	2	4	1	1	1	0	2	X	11
Kazakhstan 🔨	0	0	0	0	0	2	0	X	2

Qualification Game

Thursday, 7 February, 9:00

Sheet C	1	2	3	4	5	6	7	8	Final
Philippines 🔨	0	1	0	1	2	1	2	X	7
Chinese Taipei	1	0	1	0	0	0	0	X	2

Semifinal

Friday, 7 February, 13:00

Sheet B	1	2	3	4	5	6	7	8	Final
Philippines	0	2	0	0	1	0	X	X	3
Japan 🔨	2	0	4	1	0	3	X	X	10

Bronze medal game

Saturday, 8 February, 9:00

Sheet B	1	2	3	4	5	6	7	8	Final
Philippines	1	3	0	0	0	0	0	1	5
China 🔨	0	0	1	2	1	1	1	0	6

== Figure skating ==
The Philippines' is represented by individual skaters Paolo Borromeo, Sofia Frank, and Cathryn Limketkai. Pair skaters Isabella Gamez and Aleksandr Korovin will also compete. Russian-born Korovin received Filipino citizenship in 2024 allowing him to compete in the Asian Winter Games.

Philippine Skating Union president Nikki Cheng project at least a bronze medal for the pair of Gamez and Korovin. The pair finished fourth in the short program. They still finished fourth in both the free skate and overall missing a place on the podium.

For the individual skaters, Borromeo finished 10th, Frank ended 11th and Limketkai was 9th place overall.

Athlete(s)	Event	SP		FP		Total	
Athlete(s)	Event	Points	Rank	Points	Rank	Points	Rank
Paolo Borromeo	Men's	61.11	9	117.85	10	178.96	10
Sofia Frank	Women's	43.55	11	76.50	12	120.05	11
Cathryn Limketkai	Women's	45.28	10	91.91	9	137.19	9
Isabella Gamez / Aleksandr Korovin	Pairs	55.63	4	99.99	4	155.62	4

== Freestyle skiing ==
Laetaz Rabe recorded a 56.0 point finish in the slopestyle and provisionally placed fifth. She tried different moves for her next two runs but registered a "did not improve" for both, relegating her to 6th place. She also placed sixth in the big air.

Women

Athlete	Event	Final				
Athlete	Event	Run 1	Run 2	Run 3	Best	Rank
Laetaz Rabe	Big air	64.00	55.50	64.00	DNI	6
Laetaz Rabe	Slopestyle	56.50	DNI	DNI	56.50	6

== Short-track speed skating ==
Peter Groseclose advanced from the first round in all of his three events. He did not reach the medal rounds for his events.

Athlete	Event	Heats		Quarterfinal		Semifinal		Final	
Athlete	Event	Time	Rank	Time	Rank	Time	Rank	Time	Rank
Peter Groseclose	500 m	42.562	2 Q	42.331	3	Did not advance			
Peter Groseclose	1000 m	1:29.636	2 Q	1:28.045	3	Did not advance			
Peter Groseclose	1500 m	—N/a		2:19.318	4 q	2:32.668	6	Did not advance	

== Snowboarding ==
Adrian Tongko was supposed to compete but withdrew due to sustaining a knee injury while training in Hakuba, Japan.
