= Curling Pilipinas =

National curling governing body

Curling Winter Sports Association of the Philippines
- Sport: Curling
- Jurisdiction: Philippines
- Founded: 2023
- Affiliation: World Curling Federation
- Affiliation date: 2023
- Headquarters: Taguig, Metro Manila
- President: Benjo Delarmente
- Chairman: Jojo Milare Cruz
- Board members: Jarryd Bello (Secretary General), Jennifer de la Fuente (Treasurer), Miguel Gutierrez, Micha Suarez, Alan Frei
- Secretary: Joselito Millare Cruz

Official website
- curlingpilipinas.com
- (Philippines)

The Curling Winter Sports Association of the Philippines, Inc. (CWSAP), commonly known as Curling Pilipinas, is the national governing body of the sport of curling in the Philippines. It is responsible for promoting and developing the sport throughout the country, managing national curling teams, and representing the Philippines in international curling events.

== History ==
=== Formation of the first national team ===
The formation of Curling Winter Sports Association of the Philippines or Curling Pilipinas dates back in 2011, when a group of Filipino curlers based in the United States was formed. In 2018, Switzerland based brother Marc and Enrico Pfister were scouted for a potential Philippine national team.

However it was only in 2019 when eventual inaugural president Benjo Delarmente when momentum for the formal formation of a curling national sports association began to form. Christian Haller two-time world junior curling championship joined the Pfister brothers. Alan Frei, another Swiss-Filipino, a businessman and curling beginner, joins the trio in March 2023 – which meant the formation of a proper four-man curling team.

=== Formal establishment ===
Curling Pilipinas was officially established within 2023 with the help of the state-ran Philippine Sports Commission. By June 2023, the organization is already securing membership with the Philippine Olympic Committee (POC).

It was in September 2023, when Curling Pilipinas became a provisional member of World Curling during a congress in Seoul. The management also had to secure a last minute approval from the POC.

=== World Curling member and 2026 Winter Olympics bid ===
Curling Pilipinas had an immediate goal to qualify athletes for the 2026 Winter Olympics. No curler has ever represented the Philippines at the Winter Olympics. They were able to send a men's and women's team at the 2023 edition of the Pan Continental Curling Championships for their first international tournament following Kazakhstan's withdrawal. Philippines finished second behind China in Division B, with the latter earning a promotion.

The Philippines also made their debut at the World Senior Curling Championships in the 2024 edition. The men's team were able to attain a promotion from Division B to A in the 2024 Pan Continental Curling Championships.

The country sent a men's and women's team and a mixed doubles pair for the 2025 Asian Winter Games. The men's team won the Philippines' and Southeast Asia's first ever gold medal in the continental games. The federation has grown to having 100 officials by this time. Later in 2025, the women's team competed in 2025 Pan Continental Curling Championships B-division and won gold.

The Philippines' campaign to qualify for the 2026 Winter Olympics formally began in the 2025 Pre-Olympic Qualification Event. They qualified for the 2025 Olympic Qualification Event (OQE) by finishing as the best team in the qualifier. The team however failed to finish among the top two teams in the OQE ending their Olympic bid.

=== 2026–present ===
The Philippine senior women's team made their inaugural appearance at the World Senior Curling Championships in 2026, joining the senior men's team for their third. Prior to this tournament, the senior men's team had not yet won a game in the round robin. This year marked a turning point for both teams who achieved notable performances. The senior women's team made a commendable debut and clinched their first win, while the senior men's team also won their first game, effectively breaking their dry spell.

The men's team took part at the 2026 World Championship Qualifier Men in Aberdeen, Scotland. They qualified for their first ever World Men's Curling Championship to be held next year.

== World rankings ==
The 2025-26 season concluded with improved World Curling Federation (WCF) rankings for the different Philippine teams. All teams increased their world rank positions, and notably, the men’s team jumped 19 spots.

WCF rankings for the 2025–26 season
Current rank	Team	Points	Change
19	Men	7.205	▲19
34	Women	2.772	▲8
38	Mixed Doubles	1.667	▲8
45	Mixed	0.800	▲3

== Grassroots ==
Since curling is a winter sport and the Philippines is a tropical country, as of February 2025 the country has no proper facilities for curling and its national team players train overseas. The federation is planning to promote floor curling in the Philippines, an iceless variant. It is also coordinating with the Korean Curling Federation to rent ice where aspiring players could curl.

== National teams ==
=== Most recent rosters ===
Teams

Gender	Skip	Third	Second	Lead	Alternate	Coach	Event	Host City	Ref.
Men's	Marc Pfister	Christian Haller	Enrico Pfister	Brayden Carpenter	Alan Frei	Bernhard Werthemann	2025 Pre-Olympic Qualification Event	Aberdeen, Scotland	
Women's	Kathleen Dubberstein	Leilani Dubberstein	Jessica Byers	Lindsey Schmalz		Russ Duhaime	2025 Pan Continental Curling Championships	Eveleth, Minnesota, United States	
Mixed	Chad Alojipan	Donna Umali	Alastair Onglingswan	Ashley Alojipan			2024 World Mixed Curling Championship	Aberdeen, Scotland	
Junior Men's	Dylan Skaggs	Tyler Skaggs	Felix Hester	Elijah Mojado		Leland Rich	2025 World Junior B-Curling Championships	Lohja, Finland	
Senior Men's	Jonathan Ochoco	Peter Garbes	Jose Nazareno	Alastair Onglingswan	Jason Garbes	Heather Maclaughlin Garbes	2026 World Senior Curling Championships	Geneva, Switzerland	
Senior Women's	Sheila Mariano	Kirsten Dangaran	Cindy McAlister	Bernie Brewer		Patrick Roncal	2026 World Senior Curling Championships	Geneva, Switzerland	

Mixed Doubles and Junior Mixed Doubles

Male	Female	Coach	Event	Ref.
Marc Pfister	Kathleen Dubberstein	Jessica Pfister	2025 Asian Winter Games	
Elijah Mojado	Arianna Atienza	Gayle Salter-Kennedy	2026 World Junior Mixed Doubles	

=== Past rosters ===
Teams which had podium finishes

Tournament	Skip	Third	Second	Lead	Alternate	Coach	Result	Ref.
2025 Asian Winter Games (men's)	Marc Pfister	Christian Haller	Enrico Pfister	Alan Frei	Benjo Delarmente	Jessica Pfister	1st place, gold medalist(s)	
2025 Pan Continental Curling Championships (women's B-division)	Kathleen Dubberstein	Leilani Dubberstein	Jessica Byers	Lindsey Schmalz		Russ Duhaime	1st place, gold medalist(s)	

== Records ==
=== Men's ===
==== Winter Olympics ====
Winter Olympics
Year	Round	Position	Pld	W	L
(Italy) 2026	Did not qualify				
(France) 2030	TBD	TBD	TBD		
(United States) 2034	TBD	TBD	TBD		
Total	0 Titles	—	0	0	0

==== World Championships ====
World Curling Championship
Year	Round	Position	Pld	W	L
(Canada) 2027	Qualified				
Total	0 Titles	—	0	0	0

World Senior Curling Championships
Year	Round	Position	Pld	W	L
(Sweden) 2024	Round robin	25th place	6	0	6
(Canada) 2025	Round robin	30th place	5	0	5
(Switzerland) 2026	Round robin	32nd place	5	1	4
Total	0 Titles	—	16	1	15

World Junior Curling Championships
Year	Round	Position	Pld	W	L
(Finland) 2024	Round robin	16th place (Junior B)	7	2	5
(Finland) 2025	Round robin	12th place (Junior B)	6	2	4
Total	0 Titles	—	13	4	9

==== Pan Continental Championships ====
Pan Continental Curling Championships
Year	Round	Position	Pld	W	L
(Canada) 2023	Playoffs	2nd place (Division B)	9	7	2
(Canada) 2024	Playoffs	1st place (Division B)	12	12	0
(United States) 2025	TBD	6th place (Division A)	7	2	5
Total	0 Titles	—	28	21	7

==== Asian Winter Games ====
Asian Winter Games
Year	Result	Position	Pld	W	L
(China) 2025	Gold Medal	1st place	7	6	1
Total	1 Gold Medal	-	7	6	1

=== Women's ===
==== Winter Olympics ====
Winter Olympics
Year	Round	Position	Pld	W	L
(Italy) 2026	Ineligible to qualify				
(France) 2030	TBD	TBD	TBD		
(United States) 2034	TBD	TBD	TBD		
Total	0 Titles	—	0	0	0

==== World Championships ====
World Senior Curling Championships
Year	Round	Position	Pld	W	L
(Switzerland) 2026	Round robin	16th place	4	1	3
Total	0 Titles	—	4	1	3

==== Pan Continental Championships ====
Pan Continental Curling Championships
Year	Result	Position	Pld	W	L
(Canada) 2023	Round robin	5th place (Division B)	5	1	4
(Canada) 2024	Playoffs	4th place (Division B)	9	5	4
(United States) 2025	Gold medal	1st place (Division B)	8	8	0
Total	1 Title	1st place	22	14	8

==== Asian Winter Games ====
Asian Winter Games
Year	Round	Position	Pld	W	L
(China) 2025	Round Robin	5th Place	8	4	4
Total	0 Titles	—	8	4	4

=== Mixed ===
World Mixed Curling Championship
Year	Round	Position	Pld	W	L
(Scotland) 2024	Round robin	36th place	7	0	7
2025	TBD	TBD	TBD		
Total	0 Titles	—	7	0	7

=== Mixed Doubles ===
==== World Championships ====
World Mixed Doubles Curling Championship
Year	Round	Position	Pld	W	L
(Sweden) 2024	Did not enter				
(Canada) 2025	Did not qualify				
Total	0 Titles	—	0	0	0

World Junior Mixed Doubles Curling Championships
Year	Round	Position	Pld	W	L
(Canada) 2026	Round robin	21st place	6	1	5
Total	0 Titles	—	6	1	5

==== Asian Winter Games ====
Asian Winter Games
Year	Round	Position	Pld	W	L
(China) 2025	Bronze medal game	4th place	8	5	3
Total	0 Titles	—	8	5	3

== Presidents ==
- Benjo Delarmente (2023–)
