= Christian Haller (curler) =

Filipino curler (born 1979)

- Curler ♂
- Born: November 27, 1979 (age 46)

Team
- Skip: Marc Pfister
- Third: Christian Haller
- Second: Enrico Pfister
- Lead: Brayden Carpenter
- Alternate: Alan Frei

Curling career
- Member Association: Switzerland (until 2003); Philippines (2023–present)
- Pan Continental Championship: 1 (2025)
- Other appearances: Asian Winter Games: 1 (2025)
Medal record
Curling
Representing Switzerland
World Junior Championships
Silver medal – second place	1999 Östersund	Men's
Bronze medal – third place	1998 Thunder Bay	Men's
Winter Universiade
Silver medal – second place	2003 Tarvasio	Men's
Representing the Philippines
Asian Winter Games
Gold medal – first place	2025 Harbin	Men's

Christian Patrick Haller (born November 27, 1979) is a Filipino curler. He and his team are the 2025 Asian Winter Games men's curling tournament gold medalists.

== Career ==
=== Switzerland ===
Haller who has a curler for a father, took up curling as a child. He previously competed for Switzerland at the World Junior Curling Championships, playing in the 1998 and 1999 editions.

His silver medal at the 1999 edition was a milestone in his career. After that stint, he decided to focus on pursuing a business administration degree at University of St. Gallen. He however played in the curling event of the 2003 Winter Universiade in Tarvasio, Italy.

=== Philippines ===
Haller has been in contact with the former Swiss curler brothers Enrico and Marc Pfister and have often proposed competing together for the Philippines but were hindered by the lack of a fourth player. After novice Alan Frei joined, they formed a new federation, Curling Pilipinas in 2023 and were able to debut at the 2023 Pan Continental Curling Championships Division B tournament placing second.. They gained promotion to Division A after placing first in the 2024 tournament.

They also took part at the men's tournament of the 2025 Asian Winter Games in Harbin, China. The rink would go on to win the gold medal, beating South Korea 5–3 in the final. This was the first medal of any colour for the Philippines in the history of the Asian Winter Games, and the first gold medal at the Asian Winter Games for any Southeast Asian country.

By virtue of their qualification into the A-Division of the Pan Continental Curling Championships, the Philippines team qualified for the 2025 Pre-Olympic Qualification Event. At the pre-qualification event, the team went undefeated in the round robin with a 6–0 record, winning the event and qualifying for the 2025 Olympic Qualification Event. The team would then represent the Philippines at the 2025 Pan Continental Curling Championships, where they would finish 6th after the round robin, losing the deciding game against South Korea in an extra end and just missing out on a spot at the World Championships.

== Personal life ==
Haller after graduating worked at Ernst & Young for two years before moving to the Zurich Cantonal Bank.

== Teams ==
For Switzerland
Season	Skip	Third	Second	Lead	Alternate	Events
1997–98	Ralph Stöckli	Martin Zaugg	Simon Strübin	Clemens Oberwiler	Christian Haller	1998 WJCC (bronze)
1998–99	Christian Haller	Urs Eichhorn	Pascal Albertin	René Kunz	Patrick Vuille	1999 WJCC (silver)
2002–03	Cyril Stutz	Urs Eichhorn	Christian Haller	Yves Hess	Reto Herger	2003 WU (silver)
For the Philippines
2023–24	Marc Pfister	Christian Haller	Enrico Pfister	Alan Frei	Benjo Delarmente	2023 PCCC B (silver)
2024–25	Marc Pfister	Christian Haller	Enrico Pfister	Alan Frei	Benjo Delarmente	2024 PCCC B (gold)
2024–25	Marc Pfister	Christian Haller	Enrico Pfister	Alan Frei	Benjo Delarmente	2025 AWG (gold)
2025–26	Marc Pfister	Christian Haller	Enrico Pfister	Brayden Carpenter	Alan Frei	2025 Pre-OQE
