= 2025 Curling Pre-Olympic Qualification Event =

Qualifier for 2026 Winter Olympics

2025 Pre-Olympic Qualification Event
- Host city: Aberdeen, Scotland
- Dates: October 7–11, 2025
- Men's qualifiers: Philippines; Poland; New Zealand
- Women's qualifiers: Czech Republic; Germany; Australia

The Pre-Olympic Qualification Event in curling was held from October 7–11, 2025, in Aberdeen, Scotland. This event served as the last chance for National Olympic Committees to qualify for the Olympic Qualification Event. To be eligible for the Pre-Olympic Qualification Event, a nation must have qualified for either the 2024 or 2025 World Men's or Women's Championships, or have qualified in the A-Division of the 2024 or 2025 European Curling Championship or Pan Continental Curling Championships. Unlike in the previous Olympic cycle in 2021, no Pre-Olympic Qualification Event is being held for Mixed Doubles.

In the men's competition, the three qualifiers were the Philippines, Poland, and New Zealand, while in the women's competition, Czech Republic, Germany, and Australia qualified for the Olympic Qualification Event.

== Men ==
=== Qualification ===
Means of qualification	Vacancies	Qualified
2024 or 2025 World Men's Curling Championship	2	Austria; New Zealand
2024 or 2025 Pan Continental Curling Championship	3	Australia; Chinese Taipei; Philippines
2024 or 2025 European Curling Championship	2	Denmark; Poland
TOTAL	7	

=== Teams ===
The teams are as follows:

Australia	Austria	Chinese Taipei	Denmark
Fourth: Tanner Davis; Third: Steve Johns; Second: Matt Panoussi; Skip: Hugh Millikin; Alternate: Geoff Davis	Skip: Mathias Genner; Third: Jonas Backofen; Second: Martin Reichel; Lead: Florian Mavec; Alternate: Florian Kramlinger	Skip: Lin Ting-li; Third: Chang Che-lun; Second: Lin Chen-han; Lead: Hou Yi-ler	Fourth: Jonathan Vilandt; Skip: Jacob Schmidt; Second: Alexander Qvist; Lead: Kasper Jurlander Bøge; Alternate: Mads Nørgaard
New Zealand	Philippines	Poland	
Skip: Anton Hood; Third: Hunter Walker; Second: Ben Smith; Lead: Brett Sargon; Alternate: Jared Palanuik	Skip: Marc Pfister; Third: Christian Haller; Second: Enrico Pfister; Lead: Brayden Carpenter; Alternate: Alan Frei	Skip: Konrad Stych; Third: Krzysztof Domin; Second: Marcin Ciemiński; Lead: Bartosz Łobaza; Alternate: Maksym Grzelka	

=== Round robin standings ===
Final Round Robin Standings

Key
Qualified for the OQE via Round Robin
Teams to Playoffs

Country	Skip	W	L	W–L	DSC
Philippines	Marc Pfister	6	0	–	27.780
New Zealand	Anton Hood	5	1	–	23.900
Poland	Konrad Stych	4	2	–	82.030
Denmark	Jacob Schmidt	3	3	–	44.210
Austria	Mathias Genner	2	4	–	38.130
Australia	Hugh Millikin	1	5	–	92.550
Chinese Taipei	Lin Ting-li	0	6	–	111.970

Round Robin Summary Table
Pos.	Country	Australia	Austria	Chinese Taipei	Denmark	New Zealand	Philippines	Poland	Record
6	Australia	—	7–11	6–4	5–12	1–8	2–11	3–8	1–5
5	Austria	11–7	—	10–3	5–9	5–8	4–9	4–5	2–4
7	Chinese Taipei	4–6	3–10	—	0–10	3–10	0–10	3–12	0–6
4	Denmark	12–5	9–5	10–0	—	4–11	4–7	5–6	3–3
2	New Zealand	8–1	8–5	10–3	11–4	—	5–6	9–8	4–1
1	Philippines	11–2	9–4	10–0	7–4	6–5	—	7–2	6–0
3	Poland	8–3	5–4	12–3	6–5	8–9	2–7	—	4–2

=== Round robin results ===
All draw times are listed in British Summer Time (UTC+01:00).

==== Draw 1 ====
Tuesday, October 7, 5:30 pm

Sheet A	1	2	3	4	5	6	7	8	9	10	Final
New Zealand (Hood)	1	1	1	4	1	0	X	X	X	X	8
Australia (Millikin)	0	0	0	0	0	1	X	X	X	X	1

Sheet B	1	2	3	4	5	6	7	8	9	10	Final
Denmark (Schmidt)	0	1	1	0	1	0	1	0	0	0	4
Philippines (Pfister)	0	0	0	3	0	2	0	1	0	1	7

Sheet C	1	2	3	4	5	6	7	8	9	10	Final
Chinese Taipei (Lin)	0	1	0	1	0	0	1	X	X	X	3
Poland (Stych)	2	0	3	0	2	5	0	X	X	X	12

==== Draw 2 ====
Wednesday, October 8, 10:30 am

Sheet A	1	2	3	4	5	6	7	8	9	10	Final
Philippines (Pfister)	2	1	1	1	1	1	3	X	X	X	10
Chinese Taipei (Lin)	0	0	0	0	0	0	0	X	X	X	0

Sheet B	1	2	3	4	5	6	7	8	9	10	Final
New Zealand (Hood)	1	1	0	3	0	0	4	0	0	0	9
Poland (Stych)	0	0	1	0	2	0	0	3	1	1	8

Sheet C	1	2	3	4	5	6	7	8	9	10	Final
Austria (Genner)	2	1	0	0	1	0	1	0	0	X	5
Denmark (Schmidt)	0	0	3	1	0	2	0	2	1	X	9

==== Draw 3 ====
Wednesday, October 8, 5:30 pm

Sheet A	1	2	3	4	5	6	7	8	9	10	Final
Australia (Millikin)	0	0	0	1	0	0	0	2	0	X	3
Poland (Stych)	0	0	3	0	0	2	1	0	2	X	8

Sheet B	1	2	3	4	5	6	7	8	9	10	Final
Austria (Genner)	2	0	1	0	3	0	0	4	X	X	10
Chinese Taipei (Lin)	0	1	0	1	0	1	0	0	X	X	3

Sheet C	1	2	3	4	5	6	7	8	9	10	Final
Philippines (Pfister)	0	0	3	0	0	1	0	0	0	2	6
New Zealand (Hood)	0	1	0	0	2	0	0	1	1	0	5

==== Draw 4 ====
Thursday, October 9, 10:30 am

Sheet A	1	2	3	4	5	6	7	8	9	10	Final
Austria (Genner)	1	0	0	2	1	0	0	X	X	X	4
Philippines (Pfister)	0	2	2	0	0	3	2	X	X	X	9

Sheet B	1	2	3	4	5	6	7	8	9	10	11	Final
Poland (Stych)	0	0	1	0	0	1	0	2	1	0	1	6
Denmark (Schmidt)	0	2	0	1	0	0	1	0	0	1	0	5

Sheet C	1	2	3	4	5	6	7	8	9	10	Final
Australia (Millikin)	0	1	0	0	1	2	0	2	0	X	6
Chinese Taipei (Lin)	1	0	0	1	0	0	1	0	1	X	4

==== Draw 5 ====
Thursday, October 9, 5:30 pm

Sheet A	1	2	3	4	5	6	7	8	9	10	Final
Chinese Taipei (Lin)	0	0	0	0	0	0	X	X	X	X	0
Denmark (Schmidt)	3	2	2	1	1	1	X	X	X	X	10

Sheet B	1	2	3	4	5	6	7	8	9	10	Final
Philippines (Pfister)	2	1	3	0	5	0	X	X	X	X	11
Australia (Millikin)	0	0	0	1	0	1	X	X	X	X	2

Sheet C	1	2	3	4	5	6	7	8	9	10	Final
New Zealand (Hood)	2	0	1	0	0	0	1	0	3	1	8
Austria (Genner)	0	1	0	1	2	0	0	1	0	0	5

==== Draw 6 ====
Friday, October 10, 10:30 am

Sheet A	1	2	3	4	5	6	7	8	9	10	Final
Poland (Stych)	1	0	0	1	0	0	0	0	2	1	5
Austria (Genner)	0	1	1	0	1	0	0	1	0	0	4

Sheet B	1	2	3	4	5	6	7	8	9	10	Final
Chinese Taipei (Lin)	0	1	1	0	0	1	0	X	X	X	3
New Zealand (Hood)	3	0	0	3	2	0	2	X	X	X	10

Sheet C	1	2	3	4	5	6	7	8	9	10	Final
Denmark (Schmidt)	1	0	1	0	3	3	0	4	X	X	12
Australia (Millikin)	0	3	0	1	0	0	1	0	X	X	5

==== Draw 7 ====
Friday, October 10, 5:30 pm

Sheet A	1	2	3	4	5	6	7	8	9	10	Final
Denmark (Schmidt)	0	2	0	0	2	0	X	X	X	X	4
New Zealand (Hood)	0	0	2	3	0	6	X	X	X	X	11

Sheet B	1	2	3	4	5	6	7	8	9	10	Final
Australia (Millikin)	2	0	1	0	1	1	0	2	0	0	7
Austria (Genner)	0	4	0	1	0	0	3	0	1	2	11

Sheet C	1	2	3	4	5	6	7	8	9	10	Final
Poland (Stych)	0	0	0	1	1	0	0	0	0	X	2
Philippines (Pfister)	0	2	1	0	0	0	0	3	1	X	7

=== Playoffs ===
Qualification Game 1
2	New Zealand	6
3	Poland	7

Qualification Game 2
2	New Zealand	7
4	Denmark	1

Qualified
Poland
New Zealand

==== Qualification Game 1 ====
Saturday, October 11, 10:30 am

Sheet B	1	2	3	4	5	6	7	8	9	10	11	Final
New Zealand (Hood)	0	1	1	0	2	0	1	0	0	1	0	6
Poland (Stych)	1	0	0	1	0	0	0	0	4	0	1	7

==== Qualification Game 2 ====
Saturday, October 11, 5:30 pm

Team	1	2	3	4	5	6	7	8	9	10	Final
New Zealand (Hood)	1	1	1	0	1	0	0	3	X	X	7
Denmark (Schmidt)	0	0	0	0	0	0	1	0	X	X	1

=== Final standings ===
Key
Teams Advance to the Olympic Qualification Event

Place	Team
1st place, gold medalist(s)	Philippines
2nd place, silver medalist(s)	Poland
3rd place, bronze medalist(s)	New Zealand
4	Denmark
5	Austria
6	Australia
7	Chinese Taipei

== Women ==
=== Qualification ===
Means of qualification	Vacancies	Qualified
2024 or 2025 World Women's Curling Championship	~~2~~ 1	Lithuania; ~~New Zealand~~
2024 or 2025 Pan Continental Curling Championship	3	Australia; Chinese Taipei; Mexico
2024 or 2025 European Curling Championship	3	Czech Republic; Germany; Hungary
TOTAL	~~8~~ 7	

Note: Although the New Zealand women's team qualified for this event through their participation in the 2024 World Women's Curling Championship, they opted not to submit a team.

=== Teams ===
The teams are as follows:

Australia	Chinese Taipei	Czech Republic	Germany
Skip: Helen Williams; Third: Sara Westman; Second: Kristen Tsourlenes; Lead: Karen Titheridge; Alternate: Michelle Fredericks-Armstrong	Skip: Lee Ming-cheih; Third: Chang Chia-chi; Second: Ou Jing; Lead: Wang Yu-yuen; Alternate: Chen Szu-han	Skip: Hana Synáčková; Third: Linda Nemčoková; Second: Zuzana Pražáková; Lead: Karolína Frederiksen; Alternate: Lenka Vokounová	Fourth: Kim Sutor; Third: Emira Abbes; Second: Zoé Antes; Skip: Sara Messenzehl; Alternate: Joy Sutor
Hungary	Lithuania	Mexico	
Fourth: Linda Joó; Skip: Vera Kalocsai-van Dorp; Second: Orosolya Tóth-Csősz; Lead: Hanna Orbán; Alternate: Laura Lauchsz	Skip: Virginija Paulauskaitė; Third: Olga Dvojeglazova; Second: Miglė Kiudytė; Lead: Rūta Blažienė	Skip: Adriana Camarena; Third: Estefana Quintero; Second: Karla Knepper; Lead: Veronica Huerta; Alternate: Karla Martínez	

=== Round robin standings ===
Final Round Robin Standings

Key
Qualified for the OQE via Round Robin
Teams to Playoffs

Country	Skip	W	L	W–L	DSC
Czech Republic	Hana Synáčková	6	0	–	72.200
Germany	Sara Messenzehl	5	1	–	69.350
Hungary	Vera Kalocsai-van Dorp	3	3	1–0	69.080
Australia	Helen Williams	3	3	0–1	67.650
Mexico	Adriana Camarena	2	4	1–0	78.430
Lithuania	Virginija Paulauskaitė	2	4	0–1	43.610
Chinese Taipei	Lee Ming-cheih	0	6	–	77.530

Round Robin Summary Table
Pos.	Country	Australia	Chinese Taipei	Czech Republic	Germany	Hungary	Lithuania	Mexico	Record
4	Australia	—	12–0	5–8	6–9	7–10	7–6	7–5	3–3
7	Chinese Taipei	0–12	—	2–11	1–12	0–11	2–10	3–14	0–6
1	Czech Republic	8–5	11–2	—	10–5	9–8	7–4	9–5	6–0
2	Germany	9–6	12–1	5–10	—	9–5	8–6	12–3	5–1
3	Hungary	10–7	11–0	8–9	5–9	—	7–9	11–3	3–3
6	Lithuania	6–7	10–2	4–7	6–8	9–7	—	9–12	2–4
5	Mexico	5–7	14–3	5–9	3–12	3–11	12–9	—	2–4

=== Round robin results ===
All draw times are listed in British Summer Time (UTC+01:00).

==== Draw 1 ====
Tuesday, October 7, 5:30 pm

Sheet D	1	2	3	4	5	6	7	8	9	10	Final
Germany (Messenzehl)	0	3	1	0	2	1	0	0	1	1	9
Australia (Williams)	1	0	0	1	0	0	3	1	0	0	6

Sheet E	1	2	3	4	5	6	7	8	9	10	11	Final
Hungary (Kalocsai-van Dorp)	1	0	1	0	0	2	0	0	1	2	0	7
Lithuania (Paulauskaitė)	0	3	0	1	1	0	1	1	0	0	2	9

Sheet F	1	2	3	4	5	6	7	8	9	10	Final
Chinese Taipei (Lee)	0	2	1	0	0	0	0	X	X	X	3
Mexico (Camarena)	3	0	0	4	3	1	3	X	X	X	14

==== Draw 2 ====
Wednesday, October 8, 10:30 am

Sheet D	1	2	3	4	5	6	7	8	9	10	Final
Lithuania (Paulauskaitė)	3	0	4	2	1	0	X	X	X	X	10
Chinese Taipei (Lee)	0	1	0	0	0	1	X	X	X	X	2

Sheet E	1	2	3	4	5	6	7	8	9	10	Final
Germany (Messenzehl)	3	1	0	0	0	1	3	0	4	X	12
Mexico (Camarena)	0	0	1	1	0	0	0	1	0	X	3

Sheet F	1	2	3	4	5	6	7	8	9	10	Final
Czech Republic (Synáčková)	1	0	1	1	0	2	0	3	0	1	9
Hungary (Kalocsai-van Dorp)	0	4	0	0	2	0	1	0	1	0	8

==== Draw 3 ====
Wednesday, October 8, 5:30 pm

Sheet D	1	2	3	4	5	6	7	8	9	10	Final
Australia (Williams)	1	0	0	2	3	0	1	0	0	X	7
Mexico (Camarena)	0	0	2	0	0	1	0	1	1	X	5

Sheet E	1	2	3	4	5	6	7	8	9	10	Final
Czech Republic (Synáčková)	2	0	2	0	5	2	X	X	X	X	11
Chinese Taipei (Lee)	0	1	0	1	0	0	X	X	X	X	2

Sheet F	1	2	3	4	5	6	7	8	9	10	Final
Lithuania (Paulauskaitė)	1	0	2	0	0	0	2	0	1	X	6
Germany (Messenzehl)	0	2	0	0	3	2	0	1	0	X	8

==== Draw 4 ====
Thursday, October 9, 10:30 am

Sheet D	1	2	3	4	5	6	7	8	9	10	Final
Czech Republic (Synáčková)	0	0	2	1	1	0	0	0	3	X	7
Lithuania (Paulauskaitė)	0	1	0	0	0	3	0	0	0	X	4

Sheet E	1	2	3	4	5	6	7	8	9	10	Final
Mexico (Camarena)	0	1	0	1	0	0	1	0	X	X	3
Hungary (Kalocsai-van Dorp)	2	0	3	0	3	1	0	2	X	X	11

Sheet F	1	2	3	4	5	6	7	8	9	10	Final
Australia (Williams)	2	1	2	1	2	4	X	X	X	X	12
Chinese Taipei (Lee)	0	0	0	0	0	0	X	X	X	X	0

==== Draw 5 ====
Thursday, October 9, 5:30 pm

Sheet D	1	2	3	4	5	6	7	8	9	10	Final
Chinese Taipei (Lee)	0	0	0	0	0	0	X	X	X	X	0
Hungary (Kalocsai-van Dorp)	3	2	1	2	2	1	X	X	X	X	11

Sheet E	1	2	3	4	5	6	7	8	9	10	Final
Lithuania (Paulauskaitė)	0	1	1	0	0	0	2	0	1	1	6
Australia (Williams)	2	0	0	1	1	2	0	1	0	0	7

Sheet F	1	2	3	4	5	6	7	8	9	10	Final
Germany (Messenzehl)	0	2	0	0	0	2	0	0	1	X	5
Czech Republic (Synáčková)	1	0	1	2	1	0	4	1	0	X	10

==== Draw 6 ====
Friday, October 10, 10:30 am

Sheet D	1	2	3	4	5	6	7	8	9	10	Final
Mexico (Camarena)	0	0	2	0	1	0	1	1	0	X	5
Czech Republic (Synáčková)	1	2	0	1	0	1	0	0	4	X	9

Sheet E	1	2	3	4	5	6	7	8	9	10	Final
Chinese Taipei (Lee)	0	1	0	0	0	0	X	X	X	X	1
Germany (Messenzehl)	4	0	3	2	1	2	X	X	X	X	12

Sheet F	1	2	3	4	5	6	7	8	9	10	Final
Hungary (Kalocsai-van Dorp)	1	3	3	0	2	0	0	0	0	1	10
Australia (Williams)	0	0	0	1	0	2	1	1	2	0	7

==== Draw 7 ====
Friday, October 10, 5:30 pm

Sheet D	1	2	3	4	5	6	7	8	9	10	Final
Hungary (Kalocsai-van Dorp)	1	0	0	1	2	0	1	0	0	0	5
Germany (Messenzehl)	0	1	2	0	0	1	0	2	1	2	9

Sheet E	1	2	3	4	5	6	7	8	9	10	Final
Australia (Williams)	1	2	0	1	1	0	0	0	0	X	5
Czech Republic (Synáčková)	0	0	2	0	0	2	2	1	1	X	8

Sheet F	1	2	3	4	5	6	7	8	9	10	Final
Mexico (Camarena)	3	0	0	2	0	1	0	3	2	1	12
Lithuania (Paulauskaitė)	0	3	1	0	3	0	2	0	0	0	9

=== Playoffs ===
Qualification Game 1
2	Germany	9
3	Hungary	7

Qualification Game 2
3	Hungary	4
4	Australia	7

Qualified
Germany
Australia

==== Qualification Game 1 ====
Saturday, October 11, 10:30 am

Sheet E	1	2	3	4	5	6	7	8	9	10	Final
Germany (Messenzehl)	0	3	0	1	1	0	0	2	0	2	9
Hungary (Kalocsai-van Dorp)	1	0	1	0	0	1	2	0	2	0	7

==== Qualification Game 2 ====
Saturday, October 11, 5:30 pm

Team	1	2	3	4	5	6	7	8	9	10	Final
Hungary (Kalocsai-van Dorp)	2	1	0	1	0	0	0	0	0	X	4
Australia (Williams)	0	0	1	0	2	0	2	1	1	X	7

=== Final standings ===
Key
Teams Advance to the Olympic Qualification Event

Place	Team
1st place, gold medalist(s)	Czech Republic
2nd place, silver medalist(s)	Germany
3rd place, bronze medalist(s)	Australia
4	Hungary
5	Mexico
6	Lithuania
7	Chinese Taipei
