= Saudi Arabia at the 2025 Asian Winter Games =

- Flag of Saudi Arabia
- IOC code: KSA
- NOC: Saudi Arabian Olympic Committee

in Harbin, China 7 February 2025 – 14 February 2025
- Competitors: 8 in 2 sports
- Flag bearer: Fayik Abdi & Sharifa Al-Sudairi
- Medals: Gold 0 Silver 0 Bronze 0 Total 0

Asian Winter Games appearances
- 2025; 2029

Saudi Arabia competed at the 2025 Asian Winter Games in Harbin, China, from February 7 to 14. Saudi Arabia, the host of the upcoming 2029 edition, made its Asian Winter Games debut. The Saudi Arabian team consisted of eight athletes (six men and two women) competing in two sports: alpine skiing and curling. Alpine skiers Fayik Abdi and Sharifa Al-Sudairi were the country's opening ceremony flagbearers.

== Competitors ==
The following table lists the Saudi Arabian delegation per sport and gender.

Sport	Men	Women	Total
Alpine skiing	1	2	3
Curling	5	0	5
Total	6	2	8

== Alpine skiing ==
Saudi Arabia entered three alpine skiers (one man and two women).

Athlete	Event	Run 1		Run 2		Total	
Athlete	Event	Time	Rank	Time	Rank	Time	Rank
Fayik Abdi	Men's slalom	Did not finish					
Sharifa Al-Sudairi	Women's slalom	Did not finish					
Farhoud Joud	Women's slalom	1:03.84	24	1:01.81	20	2:05.65	19

== Curling ==
Summary

Team	Event	Group stage						Qualification	Semifinal	Final / BM	
Team	Event	Opposition Score	Opposition Score	Opposition Score	Opposition Score	Opposition Score	Rank	Opposition Score	Opposition Score	Opposition Score	Rank
Suleiman Alaqel; Munior Albeelbisi; Mohammed Aldaraan; Abdullah Alzahrani; Hussain Hagawi	Men's team	Qatar; L 4–10	China; L 1–19	Thailand; W 12–2	Japan; L 4–9	Hong Kong; L 1–15	5	Did not advance			10

=== Men's tournament ===
Saudi Arabia entered a men's team of five athletes.

Round robin

Group B	Skip	W	L	W–L	PF	PA	EW	EL	BE	SE	DSC
China	Xu Xiaoming	5	0	–	53	10	23	8	0	13	36.46
Hong Kong	Jason Chang	4	1	–	50	16	21	9	1	14	62.23
Japan	Ryo Aoki	3	2	–	52	21	19	13	3	7	63.73
Qatar	Mubarak Al-Marri	2	3	–	21	41	14	19	0	5	138.50
Saudi Arabia	Suleiman Alaqel	1	4	–	22	55	12	21	0	3	128.47
Thailand	Pongsak Mahattanasakul	0	5	–	8	73	7	26	0	1	130.14

Draw 1

Sunday, 9 February, 13:00

Sheet D	1	2	3	4	5	6	7	8	Final
Qatar (Al-Marri)	3	2	1	0	3	0	1	X	10
Saudi Arabia (Alaqel)	0	0	0	2	0	2	0	X	4

Draw 2

Sunday, 9 February, 21:00

Sheet B	1	2	3	4	5	6	7	8	Final
China (Xu)	4	3	3	5	0	4	X	X	19
Saudi Arabia (Alaqel)	0	0	0	0	1	0	X	X	1

Draw 4

Monday, 10 February, 14:00

Sheet C	1	2	3	4	5	6	7	8	Final
Thailand (Mahattanasakul)	0	1	0	0	0	1	0	X	2
Saudi Arabia (Alaqel)	2	0	4	2	2	0	2	X	12

Draw 6

Tuesday, 11 February, 14:00

Sheet E	1	2	3	4	5	6	7	8	Final
Saudi Arabia (Alaqel)	1	0	2	0	1	0	0	X	4
Japan (Aoki)	0	4	0	1	0	3	1	X	9

Draw 7

Wednesday, 12 February, 9:00

Sheet A	1	2	3	4	5	6	7	8	Final
Saudi Arabia (Alaqel)	0	0	0	0	0	1	X	X	1
Hong Kong (Chang)	4	3	2	4	2	0	X	X	15
