= Qatar at the 2025 Asian Winter Games =

- Flag of Qatar
- IOC code: QAT
- NOC: Qatar Olympic Committee

in Harbin, China 7 February 2025 – 14 February 2025
- Competitors: 15 in 4 sports
- Flag bearers: Mohammed Alnaimi & Sara Al-Qaet
- Medals: Gold 0 Silver 0 Bronze 0 Total 0

Asian Winter Games appearances
- 2011; 2017; 2025; 2029

Qatar competed at the 2025 Asian Winter Games in Harbin, China, from February 7 to 14. The Qatari team consisted of 15 athletes competing in four sports. Curlers Mohammed Alnaimi and Sara Al-Qaet were the country's opening ceremony flagbearers.

== Competitors ==
The following table lists the Qatari delegation per sport and gender.

Sport	Men	Women	Total
Curling	6	6	12
Short-track speed skating	1	0	1
Ski mountaineering	1	0	1
Snowboarding	1	0	1
Total	9	6	15

== Curling ==
Qatar entered 12 total curlers (six per gender).

Summary

Team	Event	Group stage									Qualification	Semifinal	Final / BM	
Team	Event	Opposition Score	Opposition Score	Opposition Score	Opposition Score	Opposition Score	Opposition Score	Opposition Score	Opposition Score	Rank	Opposition Score	Opposition Score	Opposition Score	Rank
Mubarak Al-Marri; Ahmed Al-Fahad; Abdulrahman Alyafei; Mohammed Alnaimi; Naif Alrumaihi	Men's team	Saudi Arabia; W 10–4	Japan; L 2–12	China; L 1–11	Hong Kong; L 2–10	Thailand; W 6–4	—N/a			4	Did not advance			8
Sara Al-Qaet; Amna Al-Qaet; Haseena Al-Fahad; Aldana Al-Fahad; Fatima Al-Fahad	Women's team	Philippines; L 1–13	China; L 0–14	Japan; L 1–12	Chinese Taipei; L 5–9	Kazakhstan; L 2–11	Thailand; L 1–10	Hong Kong; L 1–15	South Korea; L	9	Did not advance			9
Mabarka Al-Abdulla; Nasser Alyafei	Mixed doubles	Kyrgyzstan; L 6–8	South Korea; L 1–14	Philippines; L 3–11	Kazakhstan; L 4–7	China; L 1–10	—N/a			6	Did not advance			11

=== Men's tournament ===
Qatar entered a men's team.

Round robin

Pos	Team	Skip	Pld	W	L	W–L	PF	PA	DSC	Qualification
1	China	Xu Xiaoming	5	5	0	—	63	10	36.46	Semifinals
2	Hong Kong	Jason Chang	5	4	1	—	50	16	62.23	Qualification
3	Japan	Ryo Aoki	5	3	2	—	52	21	63.73	Qualification
4	Qatar	Nasser Al-Yafei	5	2	3	—	21	41	138.50	
5	Saudi Arabia	Munir Al-Beelbisi	5	1	4	—	22	55	128.47	
6	Thailand	Kaewjeen / Mahattanasakul	5	0	5	—	8	73	130.14	

Source: Official website

Draw 1

Sunday, 9 February, 13:00

Sheet D	1	2	3	4	5	6	7	8	Final
Qatar	3	2	1	0	3	0	1	X	10
Saudi Arabia 🔨	0	0	0	2	0	2	0	X	4

Draw 2

Sunday, 9 February, 21:00

Sheet C	1	2	3	4	5	6	7	8	Final
Japan 🔨	2	2	0	4	0	4	X	X	12
Qatar	0	0	1	0	1	0	X	X	2

Draw 4

Monday, 10 February, 14:00

Sheet E	1	2	3	4	5	6	7	8	Final
Qatar	0	0	0	0	1	0	X	X	1
China 🔨	3	1	3	1	0	3	X	X	11

Draw 6

Tuesday, 11 February, 14:00

Sheet B	1	2	3	4	5	6	7	8	Final
Hong Kong	3	1	2	1	0	3	X	X	10
Qatar 🔨	0	0	0	0	2	0	X	X	2

Draw 8

Wednesday, 12 February, 14:00

Sheet A	1	2	3	4	5	6	7	8	Final
Qatar	1	1	0	1	0	0	1	2	6
Thailand 🔨	0	0	1	0	2	1	0	0	4

=== Women's tournament ===
Qatar entered a women's team.

Round robin

Pos	Team	Skip	Pld	W	L	W–L	PF	PA	DSC	Qualification
1	South Korea	Gim Eun-ji	8	8	0	—	63	14	45.90	Semifinals
2	China	Wang Rui	8	7	1	—	85	21	38.69	Semifinals
3	Japan	Yuina Miura	8	6	2	—	68	30	58.25	Semifinals
4	Kazakhstan	Angelina Ebauyer	8	5	3	—	55	39	54.81	Semifinals
5	Philippines	Kathleen Dubberstein	8	4	4	—	61	36	85.56	
6	Hong Kong	Hung Ling Yue	8	3	5	—	44	45	115.69	
7	Chinese Taipei	Yang Ko	8	2	6	—	29	75	107.27	
8	Thailand	Phichayathida Jaosap	8	1	7	—	19	91	128.48	
9	Qatar	Amna Al-Qaet	8	0	8	—	11	84	180.65	

Source: Official website

Draw 2

Sunday, 9 February, 17:00

Sheet C	1	2	3	4	5	6	7	8	Final
Qatar	0	0	0	1	0	0	X	X	1
Philippines 🔨	0	5	2	0	5	1	X	X	13

Draw 3

Monday, 10 February, 9:00

Sheet B	1	2	3	4	5	6	7	8	Final
Qatar 🔨	0	0	0	0	0	0	X	X	0
China	3	4	2	3	2	0	X	X	14

Draw 4

Monday, 10 February, 19:00

Sheet D	1	2	3	4	5	6	7	8	Final
Japan 🔨	2	1	0	3	5	1	X	X	12
Qatar	0	0	1	0	0	0	X	X	1

Draw 5

Tuesday, 11 February, 9:00

Sheet E	1	2	3	4	5	6	7	8	Final
Qatar	0	0	0	1	4	0	X	X	5
Chinese Taipei 🔨	3	4	1	0	0	1	X	X	9

Draw 6

Tuesday, 11 February, 19:00

Sheet C	1	2	3	4	5	6	7	8	Final
Kazakhstan 🔨	0	0	3	4	1	3	X	X	11
Qatar	1	1	0	0	0	0	X	X	2

Draw 7

Wednesday, 12 February, 9:00

Sheet B	1	2	3	4	5	6	7	8	Final
Thailand 🔨	0	1	1	1	1	4	2	X	10
Qatar	1	0	0	0	0	0	0	X	1

Draw 8

Wednesday, 12 February, 19:00

Sheet D	1	2	3	4	5	6	7	8	Final
Qatar	1	0	0	0	0	0	X	X	1
Hong Kong 🔨	0	5	4	2	1	3	X	X	15

Draw 9

Thursday, 13 February, 9:00

Sheet A	1	2	3	4	5	6	7	8	Final
South Korea 🔨	4	1							W
Qatar	0	0							L

- Qatar forfeited the game after end 2 as they did not have enough remaining members to continue to play.

=== Mixed doubles tournament ===
Qatar entered a mixed doubles pair.

Round robin

Pos	Team	Athletes	Pld	W	L	W–L	PF	PA	DSC	Qualification
1	China	Han / Wang	5	5	0	—	44	19	37.46	Semifinals
2	Philippines	Dubberstein / Pfister	5	4	1	—	50	22	58.24	Qualification
3	South Korea	Kim / Seong	5	3	2	—	50	22	47.83	Qualification
4	Kazakhstan	Seitzhanova / Nadirbayev	5	2	3	—	26	43	55.33	
5	Kyrgyzstan	Asanbaeva / Abykeev	5	1	4	—	21	50	114.23	
6	Qatar	Al-Abdulla / Al-Yafei	5	0	5	—	15	50	98.31	

Source: Official website

Draw 1

Tuesday, 4 February, 10:00

Sheet B	1	2	3	4	5	6	7	8	Final
Qatar 🔨	1	0	0	4	0	0	0	1	6
Kyrgyzstan	0	4	1	0	1	1	1	0	8

Draw 2

Tuesday, 4 February, 14:00

Sheet E	1	2	3	4	5	6	7	8	Final
South Korea 🔨	1	2	3	0	5	3	X	X	14
Qatar	0	0	0	1	0	0	X	X	1

Draw 3

Wednesday, 5 February, 10:00

Sheet C	1	2	3	4	5	6	7	8	Final
Philippines 🔨	0	3	3	1	3	1	X	X	11
Qatar	3	0	0	0	0	0	X	X	3

Draw 5

Wednesday, 5 February, 18:00

Sheet D	1	2	3	4	5	6	7	8	Final
Kazakhstan	1	2	0	1	1	1	0	1	7
Qatar 🔨	0	0	2	0	0	0	2	0	4

Draw 8

Thursday, 6 February, 18:00

Sheet A	1	2	3	4	5	6	7	8	Final
Qatar	0	0	0	0	0	1	X	X	1
China 🔨	4	3	1	1	1	0	X	X	10

== Short-track speed skating ==
Qatar entered one male short track speed skater.

Athlete	Event	Heat		Quarterfinal		Semifinal		Final	
Athlete	Event	Time	Rank	Time	Rank	Time	Rank	Time	Rank
Mohammed Al-Abdulla	Men's 500 m	1:05.864	5	Did not advance					37
Mohammed Al-Abdulla	Men's 1000 m	2:00.512	4	Did not advance					35
Mohammed Al-Abdulla	Men's 1500 m	—N/a		DNF	5	Did not advance			–

== Ski mountaineering ==
Qatar entered one male snow mountaineer.

Men

Athlete	Event	Qualification		Semifinals		Final	
Athlete	Event	Time	Rank	Time	Rank	Time	Rank
Khalifa Elmagarmid	Sprint	9:11.59	22	Did not advance			

== Snowboarding ==
Qatar entered one male snowboarder.

Men

Athlete	Event	Qualification				Final				
Athlete	Event	Run 1	Run 2	Best	Rank	Run 1	Run 2	Run 3	Best	Rank
Mohammad Khalid Al Kuwari	Slopestyle	3.00	5.25	5.25	12	Did not advance				
