= Curling at the 2025 Asian Winter Games =

Curling competitions at the 2025 Asian Winter Games

- Venue: Pingfang Curling Arena
- Dates: 4–14 February 2025
- Competitors: 113 from 13 nations

Curling competitions at the 2025 Asian Winter Games in Harbin, China, were held at the Harbin Pingfang District Curling Arena between 4–14 February 2025. A total of three events were contested: a men's, women's, and mixed doubles tournament. This also marked the debut of mixed doubles curling at the Asian Winter Games.

== Schedule ==
P	Preliminary round	¼	Quarterfinals	½	Semifinal	F	Finals

Event↓/Date →	4th Tue	5th Wed	6th Thu	7th Fri		8th Sat	9th Sun	10th Mon	11th Tue	12th Wed	13th Thu		14th Fri
Men's team							P	P	P	P	¼	½	F
Women's team							P	P	P	P	P	½	F
Mixed doubles	P	P	P	¼	½	F							

== Medalists ==
Event	Gold	Silver	Bronze
Men's team	Philippines; Marc Pfister; Christian Haller; Enrico Pfister; Alan Frei; Benjo Delarmente	South Korea; Lee Jae-beom; Kim Hyo-jun; Kim Eun-bin; Pyo Jeong-min; Kim Jin-hun	China; Xu Xiaoming; Fei Xueqing; Wang Zhiyu; Li Zhichao; Ye Jianjun
Women's team	South Korea; Gim Eun-ji; Kim Min-ji; Kim Su-ji; Seol Ye-eun; Seol Ye-ji	China; Wang Rui; Han Yu; Dong Ziqi; Jiang Jiayi; Su Tingyu	Japan; Yuina Miura; Suzune Yasui; Yuna Sakuma; Ai Matsunaga; Hana Ikeda
Mixed doubles	Japan; Tori Koana; Go Aoki	South Korea; Kim Kyeong-ae; Seong Ji-hoon	China; Han Yu; Wang Zhiyu

== Medal table ==
Rank	Nation	Gold	Silver	Bronze	Total
1	South Korea (KOR)	1	2	0	3
2	Japan (JPN)	1	0	1	2
3	Philippines (PHI)	1	0	0	1
4	China (CHN)	0	1	2	3
Totals (4 entries)		3	3	3	9

== Participating nations ==
A total of 113 athletes from 13 nations competed in curling at the 2025 Asian Winter Games:

- China (10)
- Chinese Taipei (10)
- Hong Kong (10)
- Japan (12)
- Kazakhstan (12)
- Kuwait (2)
- Kyrgyzstan (5)
- Mongolia (2)
- Philippines (10)
- Qatar (11)
- Saudi Arabia (5)
- South Korea (12)
- Thailand (12)

== Final standing ==
=== Men ===
Rank	Team	Pld	W	L
1st place, gold medalist(s)	Philippines	7	6	1
2nd place, silver medalist(s)	South Korea	6	5	1
3rd place, bronze medalist(s)	China	7	6	1
4	Hong Kong	8	5	3
5	Japan	6	3	3
5	Kazakhstan	5	2	3
7	Chinese Taipei	4	1	3
8	Qatar	5	2	3
9	Kyrgyzstan	4	0	4
10	Saudi Arabia	5	1	4
11	Thailand	5	0	5

=== Women ===
Rank	Team	Pld	W	L
1st place, gold medalist(s)	South Korea	10	10	0
2nd place, silver medalist(s)	China	10	8	2
3rd place, bronze medalist(s)	Japan	10	7	3
4	Kazakhstan	10	5	5
5	Philippines	8	4	4
6	Hong Kong	8	3	5
7	Chinese Taipei	8	2	6
8	Thailand	8	1	7
9	Qatar	8	0	8

=== Mixed doubles ===
Rank	Team	Pld	W	L
1st place, gold medalist(s)	Japan	7	7	0
2nd place, silver medalist(s)	South Korea	8	5	3
3rd place, bronze medalist(s)	China	7	6	1
4	Philippines	8	5	3
5	Chinese Taipei	6	3	3
5	Hong Kong	6	4	2
7	Kazakhstan	5	2	3
8	Thailand	5	2	3
9	Kyrgyzstan	5	1	4
10	Kuwait	5	1	4
11	Qatar	5	0	5
12	Mongolia	5	0	5
