= Alan Frei =

Filipino curler (born 1982)

- Curler ♂
- Born: March 27, 1982 (age 44)

Team
- Curling club: CC Adelboden; Adelboden, Switzerland
- Skip: Marc Pfister
- Third: Christian Haller
- Second: Enrico Pfister
- Lead: Brayden Carpenter
- Alternate: Alan Frei

Curling career
- Member Association: Philippines
- Pan Continental Championship: 1 (2025)
- Other appearances: Asian Winter Games: 1 (2025)
Medal record
Curling
Representing the Philippines
Asian Winter Games
Gold medal – first place	2025 Harbin	Men's

Alan Beat Frei (born March 27, 1982) is a Filipino and Swiss entrepreneur and former curler. He and his team are the 2025 Asian Winter Games men's curling tournament gold medalists.

== Education ==
Alan Frei studied Sinology at the Nanjing Normal University in China and later finance at the University of Zurich (UZH)

== Business career ==
Frei from 2004 to 2014 pursued 50 failed business ideas and eight startups.

In 2014, Frei along with Lukas Speiser founded Amorana, a sex toy and lingerie online shop, his first successful business. He credited the success of the shop to the popularity of the film Fifty Shades of Grey at the time. He sold a majority stake to the Lovehoney Group in 2020, giving him financial stability. He founded the start-up Center at the University of Zurich.

Post-Amorana, Frei founded the Alan Frei Company. The business focuses on creating content and products for a life hacker community. Additionally, he works part-time as a freelance Uber Eats driver.

== Curling career ==
Alan Frei as part of a bid to lose weight aimed to compete in the 2026 Winter Olympics. Frei initially tried getting into cross-country skiing but dropped the sport after he found he has "no talent" in it. In April 2023, he took up curling and found a coach who Frei taught entrepreneurship.

Frei was scouted by former Swiss professional curler Marcel Käufeler and teammates Marc Pfister, Enrico Pfister, and Christian Haller who were looking for a fourth member to complete a Philippine men's national team. To be able to compete internationally they formed Curling Pilipinas, which joined the World Curling Federation within the year.

Their first tournament was the 2023 Pan Continental Curling Championships (PCCC), held from October 29 to November 4 in Kelowna, British Columbia. His team placed second in the B division. At the 2024 Pan Continental Curling Championships Frei and his team made the finals and moved up to the A Division for the 2025 championship. The rink would also go on to represent the Philippines at the 2025 Asian Winter Games, where they would win the gold medal, beating South Korea 5–3 in the final. This was the first medal of any colour for the Philippines in the history of the Asian Winter Games, and the first gold medal at the Asian Winter Games for any Southeast Asian Country.

By virtue of their qualification into the A-Division of the Pan Continental Curling Championships, the Philippines team qualified for the 2025 Pre-Olympic Qualification Event. At the pre-qualification event, the team went undefeated in the round robin with a 6–0 record, winning the event and qualifying for the 2025 Olympic Qualification Event. The team would then represent the Philippines at the 2025 Pan Continental Curling Championships, where they would finish 6th after the round robin, losing the deciding game against South Korea in an extra end and just missing out on a spot at the World Championships. He retired from curling and transitioned into being a poker player.

== Personal life ==
Frei's mother is a Filipino, specifically a Cebuano woman. He also has roots to Leyte.

He reduced his possessions to 70 items and, by October 2020, had decided to give up his apartment, has been staying in hotels instead for the last three years in at least 53 countries. As of 2022, Frei has ended this practice.

Frei hosts a podcast and YouTube channel. He holds Swiss and Filipino citizenship.
