= Enrico Pfister =

Austrian footballer

Personal information
- Date of birth: 4 April 1982 (age 44)
- Place of birth: Austria
- Height: 1.80 m (5 ft 11 in)
- Position: Defender

Team information
- Current team: SC Rheindorf Altach
- Number: 4

Senior career*
| Years | Team | Apps | (Gls) |
| 2004–2010 | SC Rheindorf Altach | 102 | (1) |
- * Club domestic league appearances and goals

Enrico Pfister (born 4 April 1982) is an Austrian retired football player. He spent his entire senior career at SC Rheindorf Altach.
