= Enrico Pfister (curler) =

Filipino curler (born 1991)

- Curler
- Born: April 7, 1991 (age 35); Bern, Switzerland

Team
- Curling club: CC Adelboden; Adelboden, Switzerland
- Skip: Marc Pfister
- Third: Christian Haller
- Second: Enrico Pfister
- Lead: Brayden Carpenter
- Alternate: Alan Frei

Curling career
- Member Association: Switzerland (2009-2023); Philippines (2023-Present)
- World Championship: 3 (2015, 2016, 2018)
- Pan Continental Championship: 1 (2025)
- Other appearances: Asian Winter Games: 1 (2025)
Medal record
Curling
Representing the Philippines
Asian Winter Games
Gold medal – first place	2025 Harbin	Men's

Enrico Gabriel Otida Pfister (born April 7, 1991) is a Filipino curler. He and his team are the 2025 Asian Winter Games men's curling tournament gold medalists.

Pfister has competed in three World Championships for Switzerland, and won gold for the Philippines in Harbin 2025.

== Career ==
=== Switzerland (2009-2023) ===
As a junior curler, Pfister played lead for Switzerland (skipped by David Bartschiger) at the 2009 World Junior Curling Championships, where they finished sixth.

Pfister competed at the 2015 Ford World Men's Curling Championship in Halifax, Nova Scotia, Canada, as third alongside his brother Marc Pfister who was the skip for the Swiss national curling team. The Swiss team had a great start at the tournament, but lost their last five games. These last five consecutive losses placed the young Swiss team at 5–6 after the round robin, finishing 7th.

Sven Michel joined the team in 2015 to skip the rink, and Pfister would play second. They would play in three Grand Slams, missing the playoffs in all of them. Pfister returned to the Worlds in 2016. The team had another disappointing tournament, going 4–7 and finishing 9th. After the season, the team and Michel parted ways.

Pfister returned with his brother as part of the Swiss team again at the 2018 World Men's Curling Championship. The Swiss finished with a 6–6 record, in 7th place. They narrowly missed the playoffs, as they had the same record as the United States, but missed the playoffs by virtue of losing their last round robin game to the Americans who qualified in their stead. That season, Team Pfister won the German Masters which would qualify for them to play in the 2018 Humpty's Champions Cup Grand Slam event. There, the rink went winless, missing the playoffs.

=== Philippines (2023–present) ===
In September 2023, Curling Pilipinas, the national curling organization of the Philippines, announced that Pfister would be joining his brother Marc, Christian Haller, and Alan Frei as part of Philippine Men's Team, in the country's inaugural international curling appearance at the 2023 Pan Continental Curling Championships, B-Division, scheduled to take place in Kelowna, BC, Canada, from October 29 to November 4, 2023. The Pfisters were able to compete for the Philippines, as their mother is from there. In their second season together as a team, the Pfister rink would win the 2024 Pan Continental Curling Championships B-Division, qualifying them to compete in the 2025 Pan Continental Curling Championships A-Division for the upcoming season. The rink would also go on to represent the Philippines at the 2025 Asian Winter Games, where they would win the gold medal, beating South Korea 5–3 in the final. This was the first medal of any colour for the Philippines in the history of the Asian Winter Games, and the first gold medal at the Asian Winter Games for any Southeast Asian country.

By virtue of their qualification into the A-Division of the Pan Continental Curling Championships, the Philippines team qualified for the 2025 Pre-Olympic Qualification Event. At the pre-qualification event, the team went undefeated in the round robin with a 6–0 record, winning the event and qualifying for the 2025 Olympic Qualification Event. The team would then represent the Philippines at the 2025 Pan Continental Curling Championships, where they would finish 6th after the round robin, losing the deciding game against South Korea in an extra end and just missing out on a spot at the World Championships.
