= 2024 Pan Continental Curling Championships =

Annual curling tournament

- Host city: Lacombe, Alberta, Canada
- Arena: Gary Moe Auto Group Sportsplex (A Division); Lacombe Curling Club (B Division)
- Dates: October 27 – November 2
- Men's winner: China
- Curling club: CSO Curling Club, Beijing
- Skip: Xu Xiaoming
- Third: Fei Xueqing
- Second: Wang Zhiyu
- Lead: Li Zhichao
- Alternate: Ye Jianjun
- Coach: Tan Weidong
- Finalist: Japan (Abe)
- Women's winner: Canada
- Curling club: Ottawa Curling Club, Ottawa
- Skip: Rachel Homan
- Third: Tracy Fleury
- Second: Emma Miskew
- Lead: Sarah Wilkes
- Alternate: Rachelle Brown
- Coach: Viktor Kjäll
- Finalist: South Korea (Gim)

The 2024 Pan Continental Curling Championships were held from October 27 to November 2 at the Gary Moe Auto Group Sportsplex (A Division) and the Lacombe Curling Club (B Division) in Lacombe, Alberta, Canada. The event was used to qualify teams for the 2025 World Curling Championships. Both men's and women's events consisted of an A Division and B Division.

In the men's competition, Canada automatically qualified as the host nation for the 2025 World Men's Curling Championship, which will be held in Moose Jaw, Saskatchewan. Furthermore, the top four teams from the A Division (China, Japan, the United States, South Korea) also secured qualification for the championship. Conversely, the team ranked lowest in the A Division (Chinese Taipei) was relegated to the B Division in the following year. Additionally, the top finisher in the B Division (Philippines) earned promotion to the A Division for the 2025 championship.

On the women's side, South Korea earned automatic qualification as the host nation for the 2025 World Women's Curling Championship, scheduled to be held in Uijeongbu. Similar to the men's division, the top four teams from the A Division (Canada, China, Japan, the United States), in addition to South Korea, also secured qualification for the World Women's Championship and the team with the lowest ranking in the A Division (Chinese Taipei) was relegated to the B Division, while the top finisher in the B Division (Australia) will be promoted to the A Division for the 2025 championship.

== Medallists ==
A Division	Gold	Silver	Bronze
Men	China; Xu Xiaoming; Fei Xueqing; Wang Zhiyu; Li Zhichao; Ye Jianjun	Japan; Tetsuro Shimizu (Fourth); Shinya Abe (Skip); Hayato Sato; Haruto Ouchi; Sota Tsuruga	United States; John Shuster; Chris Plys; Colin Hufman; Matt Hamilton; John Landsteiner
Women	Canada; Rachel Homan; Tracy Fleury; Emma Miskew; Sarah Wilkes; Rachelle Brown	South Korea; Gim Eun-ji; Kim Min-ji; Kim Su-ji; Seol Ye-eun; Seol Ye-ji	China; Wang Rui; Han Yu; Dong Ziqi; Jiang Jiayi; Su Tingyu

B Division	Gold	Silver	Bronze
Men	Philippines; Marc Pfister; Christian Haller; Enrico Pfister; Alan Frei; Benjo Delarmente	Kazakhstan; Abylaikhan Zhuzbay; Madiyar Korabayev; Aidos Alliyar; Ibragim Tastemir; Arman Irjanov	Hong Kong; Jason Chang; Martin Yan; Woody Cheng; Jacky Chung; Ronnie Ma
Women	Australia; Helen Williams; Sara Westman; Karen Titheridge; Kristin Tsourlenes; Michelle Fredericks-Armstrong	Jamaica; Madeleine Spurgeon (Fourth); Stephanie Chen; Margot Shepherd-Spurgeon (Skip); Alexandra Marriott; Theresa Chen	Kazakhstan; Tilsimay Alliyarova (Fourth); Yekaterina Kolykhalova; Angelina Ebauyer (Skip); Merey Tastemir; Yana Ebauyer

== Men ==
=== A division ===
==== Qualification ====
The following nations qualified to participate in the 2024 Pan Continental Curling Championship A Division:

Event	Vacancies	Qualified
2023 Pan Continental Curling Championships A Division	7	Canada; South Korea; Japan; United States; New Zealand; Australia; Chinese Taipei
2023 Pan Continental Curling Championships B Division	1	China
TOTAL	8	

==== Teams ====
The teams are listed as follows:

Australia	Canada	China	Chinese Taipei
Fourth: Dean Hewitt; Third: Tanner Davis; Second: Steve Johns; Skip: Hugh Millikin; Alternate: Steve Hewitt	Skip: Brad Gushue; Third: Mark Nichols; Second: Brendan Bottcher; Lead: Geoff Walker; Alternate: Adam Casey	Skip: Xu Xiaoming; Third: Fei Xueqing; Second: Wang Zhiyu; Lead: Li Zhichao; Alternate: Ye Jianjun	Fourth: Eric Stevens; Third: Luis Yin Liu; Second: Victor Lee; Skip: Ken Hsu; Alternate: Nicholas Hsu
Japan	New Zealand	South Korea	United States
Fourth: Tetsuro Shimizu; Skip: Shinya Abe; Second: Hayato Sato; Lead: Haruto Ouchi; Alternate: Sota Tsuruga	Skip: Anton Hood; Third: Hunter Walker; Second: Ben Smith; Lead: Brett Sargon; Alternate: Jared Palanuik	Skip: Lee Jae-beom; Third: Kim Hyo-jun; Second: Pyo Jeong-min; Lead: Kim Eun-bin; Alternate: Kim Jin-hun	Skip: John Shuster; Third: Chris Plys; Second: Colin Hufman; Lead: Matt Hamilton; Alternate: John Landsteiner

==== Round robin standings ====
Final Round Robin Standings

Key
Teams to Playoffs and Qualified for the 2025 World Men's Curling Championship
Team Qualified for the 2025 World Men's Curling Championship
Team Relegated to 2025 B Division

Country	Skip	W	L	W–L	PF	PA	EW	EL	BE	SE	S%	DSC
Canada	Brad Gushue	7	0	–	71	31	34	22	1	9	89.0%	20.78
United States	John Shuster	6	1	–	56	28	32	20	2	15	85.3%	21.63
China	Xu Xiaoming	4	3	1–0	46	37	27	29	5	5	85.2%	29.35
Japan	Shinya Abe	4	3	0–1	42	30	28	23	6	10	81.8%	23.96
South Korea	Lee Jae-beom	3	4	–	47	44	23	25	4	8	81.2%	39.89
Australia	Hugh Millikin	2	5	1–0	44	54	29	27	2	9	78.1%	24.08
New Zealand	Anton Hood	2	5	0–1	41	48	23	26	4	5	81.1%	21.74
Chinese Taipei	Ken Hsu	0	7	–	15	90	11	35	1	0	60.1%	90.49

Round Robin Summary Table
Pos.	Country	Australia	Canada	China	Chinese Taipei	Japan	New Zealand	South Korea	United States	Record
6	Australia	—	8–13	4–8	11–2	4–7	8–6	7–9	2–9	2–5
1	Canada	13–8	—	7–4	17–1	7–5	10–5	10–3	7–5	7–0
3	China	8–4	4–7	—	12–4	5–4	7–5	4–5	6–8	4–3
8	Chinese Taipei	2–11	1–17	4–12	—	1–9	3–13	1–19	3–9	0–7
4	Japan	7–4	5–7	4–5	9–1	—	9–1	6–4	2–8	4–3
7	New Zealand	6–8	5–10	5–7	13–3	1–9	—	9–1	2–10	2–5
5	South Korea	9–7	3–10	5–4	19–1	4–6	1–9	—	6–7	3–4
2	United States	9–2	5–7	8–6	9–3	8–2	10–2	7–6	—	6–1

==== Round robin results ====
All draw times are listed in Mountain Time (UTC−06:00).

===== Draw 1 =====
Sunday, October 27, 8:30

Sheet A	1	2	3	4	5	6	7	8	9	10	Final
Australia (Millikin)	0	0	1	0	0	1	1	0	1	X	4
China (Xu)	0	2	0	2	1	0	0	3	0	X	8

Sheet B	1	2	3	4	5	6	7	8	9	10	Final
Canada (Gushue)	1	0	2	2	1	0	4	X	X	X	10
South Korea (Lee)	0	1	0	0	0	2	0	X	X	X	3

Sheet C	1	2	3	4	5	6	7	8	9	10	Final
New Zealand (Hood)	0	1	0	0	1	0	X	X	X	X	2
United States (Shuster)	1	0	3	3	0	3	X	X	X	X	10

Sheet D	1	2	3	4	5	6	7	8	9	10	Final
Japan (Abe)	1	0	3	2	2	1	X	X	X	X	9
Chinese Taipei (Hsu)	0	1	0	0	0	0	X	X	X	X	1

===== Draw 2 =====
Sunday, October 27, 19:30

Sheet A	1	2	3	4	5	6	7	8	9	10	Final
South Korea (Lee)	2	0	1	0	0	1	0	2	0	0	6
United States (Shuster)	0	1	0	1	0	0	0	0	4	1	7

Sheet B	1	2	3	4	5	6	7	8	9	10	Final
Japan (Abe)	2	1	1	0	2	0	0	1	0	X	7
Australia (Millikin)	0	0	0	1	0	1	1	0	1	X	4

Sheet C	1	2	3	4	5	6	7	8	9	10	Final
Chinese Taipei (Hsu)	0	0	1	0	0	0	X	X	X	X	1
Canada (Gushue)	3	5	0	2	1	6	X	X	X	X	17

Sheet D	1	2	3	4	5	6	7	8	9	10	Final
China (Xu)	2	0	0	2	0	1	0	1	0	1	7
New Zealand (Hood)	0	1	0	0	2	0	1	0	1	0	5

===== Draw 3 =====
Monday, October 28, 14:00

Sheet A	1	2	3	4	5	6	7	8	9	10	Final
Canada (Gushue)	3	0	1	0	0	3	0	3	X	X	10
New Zealand (Hood)	0	1	0	0	2	0	2	0	X	X	5

Sheet B	1	2	3	4	5	6	7	8	9	10	Final
Chinese Taipei (Hsu)	1	0	0	0	1	0	2	0	X	X	4
China (Xu)	0	4	3	2	0	2	0	1	X	X	12

Sheet C	1	2	3	4	5	6	7	8	9	10	Final
United States (Shuster)	1	1	0	2	0	0	2	3	X	X	9
Australia (Millikin)	0	0	1	0	0	1	0	0	X	X	2

Sheet D	1	2	3	4	5	6	7	8	9	10	Final
South Korea (Lee)	0	1	0	1	0	0	0	0	2	0	4
Japan (Abe)	0	0	2	0	0	0	0	3	0	1	6

===== Draw 4 =====
Tuesday, October 29, 9:00

Sheet A	1	2	3	4	5	6	7	8	9	10	Final
Chinese Taipei (Hsu)	0	0	2	0	0	0	0	X	X	X	2
Australia (Millikin)	3	1	0	2	1	0	4	X	X	X	11

Sheet B	1	2	3	4	5	6	7	8	9	10	Final
South Korea (Lee)	0	0	0	0	1	0	X	X	X	X	1
New Zealand (Hood)	1	1	1	3	0	3	X	X	X	X	9

Sheet C	1	2	3	4	5	6	7	8	9	10	Final
China (Xu)	0	0	1	0	1	0	0	2	0	1	5
Japan (Abe)	0	1	0	1	0	0	1	0	1	0	4

Sheet D	1	2	3	4	5	6	7	8	9	10	Final
United States (Shuster)	0	0	2	0	1	1	0	1	0	0	5
Canada (Gushue)	1	0	0	2	0	0	2	0	1	1	7

===== Draw 5 =====
Tuesday, October 29, 19:00

Sheet A	1	2	3	4	5	6	7	8	9	10	Final
Japan (Abe)	0	1	0	1	0	0	1	1	0	1	5
Canada (Gushue)	2	0	2	0	1	1	0	0	1	0	7

Sheet B	1	2	3	4	5	6	7	8	9	10	Final
China (Xu)	1	0	0	3	0	0	1	0	0	1	6
United States (Shuster)	0	2	0	0	2	1	1	0	2	0	8

Sheet C	1	2	3	4	5	6	7	8	9	10	Final
South Korea (Lee)	7	2	3	4	0	3	X	X	X	X	19
Chinese Taipei (Hsu)	0	0	0	0	1	0	X	X	X	X	1

Sheet D	1	2	3	4	5	6	7	8	9	10	Final
New Zealand (Hood)	2	0	3	0	0	0	0	1	0	0	6
Australia (Millikin)	0	3	0	2	1	0	0	0	1	1	8

===== Draw 6 =====
Wednesday, October 30, 14:00

Sheet A	1	2	3	4	5	6	7	8	9	10	Final
China (Xu)	0	0	2	0	0	2	0	0	0	0	4
South Korea (Lee)	0	0	0	0	1	0	0	2	1	1	5

Sheet B	1	2	3	4	5	6	7	8	9	10	Final
Australia (Millikin)	0	3	0	2	0	2	0	1	0	X	8
Canada (Gushue)	2	0	3	0	2	0	4	0	2	X	13

Sheet C	1	2	3	4	5	6	7	8	9	10	Final
Japan (Abe)	1	2	1	2	0	3	X	X	X	X	9
New Zealand (Hood)	0	0	0	0	1	0	X	X	X	X	1

Sheet D	1	2	3	4	5	6	7	8	9	10	Final
Chinese Taipei (Hsu)	0	0	0	2	0	0	1	X	X	X	3
United States (Shuster)	1	1	1	0	2	4	0	X	X	X	9

===== Draw 7 =====
Thursday, October 31, 9:00

Sheet A	1	2	3	4	5	6	7	8	9	10	Final
United States (Shuster)	2	1	1	3	0	1	X	X	X	X	8
Japan (Abe)	0	0	0	0	2	0	X	X	X	X	2

Sheet B	1	2	3	4	5	6	7	8	9	10	Final
New Zealand (Hood)	2	1	0	3	3	0	0	4	X	X	13
Chinese Taipei (Hsu)	0	0	1	0	0	2	0	0	X	X	3

Sheet C	1	2	3	4	5	6	7	8	9	10	Final
Australia (Millikin)	1	0	2	1	0	0	1	2	0	0	7
South Korea (Lee)	0	1	0	0	4	1	0	0	0	3	9

Sheet D	1	2	3	4	5	6	7	8	9	10	Final
Canada (Gushue)	2	1	2	0	0	0	0	1	0	1	7
China (Xu)	0	0	0	0	2	0	1	0	1	0	4

==== Playoffs ====
Semifinals
1	Canada	4
4	Japan	8
2	United States	4
3	China	7

Gold medal game
4	Japan	4
3	China	6
Bronze medal game
1	Canada	8
2	United States	10

===== Semifinals =====
Thursday, October 31, 19:00

Sheet A	1	2	3	4	5	6	7	8	9	10	Final
Canada (Gushue)	0	2	0	1	0	1	0	0	0	X	4
Japan (Abe)	2	0	1	0	2	0	0	1	2	X	8

Player percentages
Canada		Japan	
Geoff Walker	89%	Sota Tsuruga	96%
Brendan Bottcher	85%	Hayato Sato	79%
Mark Nichols	83%	Shinya Abe	82%
Brad Gushue	69%	Tetsuro Shimizu	68%
Total	82%	Total	81%

Sheet C	1	2	3	4	5	6	7	8	9	10	Final
United States (Shuster)	1	0	1	0	0	0	1	0	1	X	4
China (Xu)	0	1	0	2	1	1	0	2	0	X	7

Player percentages
United States		China	
Matt Hamilton	97%	Li Zhichao	97%
Colin Hufman	85%	Wang Zhiyu	88%
Chris Plys	82%	Fei Xueqing	82%
John Shuster	72%	Xu Xiaoming	94%
Total	84%	Total	90%

===== Bronze medal game =====
Friday, November 1, 14:00

Sheet B	1	2	3	4	5	6	7	8	9	10	Final
Canada (Gushue)	2	0	2	0	1	0	2	0	1	0	8
United States (Shuster)	0	2	0	3	0	2	0	2	0	1	10

Player percentages
Canada		United States	
Geoff Walker	91%	Matt Hamilton	90%
Brendan Bottcher	85%	Colin Hufman	91%
Mark Nichols	88%	Chris Plys	89%
Brad Gushue	84%	John Shuster	89%
Total	87%	Total	90%

===== Gold medal game =====
Saturday, November 2, 10:00

Sheet B	1	2	3	4	5	6	7	8	9	10	Final
Japan (Abe)	0	0	0	1	0	0	2	0	1	0	4
China (Xu)	0	0	2	0	1	1	0	1	0	1	6

Player percentages
Japan		China	
Sota Tsuruga	91%	Li Zhichao	95%
Hayato Sato	71%	Wang Zhiyu	88%
Shinya Abe	68%	Fei Xueqing	90%
Tetsuro Shimizu	84%	Xu Xiaoming	84%
Total	78%	Total	89%

==== Player percentages ====
Round robin only

Leads	%
(Canada) Geoff Walker	92.2
(China) Li Zhichao	89.8
(United States) Matt Hamilton	89.0
(Australia) Hugh Millikin (Skip)	87.8
(South Korea) Kim Eun-bin	87.7

Seconds	%
(Canada) Brendan Bottcher	92.7
(Japan) Hayato Sato	84.1
(China) Wang Zhiyu	84.1
(South Korea) Pyo Jeong-min	83.5
(New Zealand) Ben Smith	82.2

Thirds	%
(Canada) Mark Nichols	86.0
(United States) Chris Plys	85.1
(China) Fei Xueqing	83.4
(New Zealand) Hunter Walker	81.6
(South Korea) Kim Hyo-jun	80.3

Skips	%
(United States) John Shuster	85.2
(Canada) Brad Gushue	84.9
(China) Xu Xiaoming	83.3
(Japan) Tetsuro Shimizu (Fourth)	77.3
(New Zealand) Anton Hood	76.2

==== Final standings ====
Key
Teams Advance to the 2025 World Men's Curling Championship
Team Relegated to 2025 B Division

Place	Team
1st place, gold medalist(s)	China
2nd place, silver medalist(s)	Japan
3rd place, bronze medalist(s)	United States
4	Canada
5	South Korea
6	Australia
7	New Zealand
8	Chinese Taipei

=== B division ===
==== Teams ====
Brazil	Hong Kong	India	Jamaica
Skip: Marcelo Cabral de Mello; Third: Marcio Rodrigues; Second: Bruno Sarti; Lead: Filipe Nunes; Alternate: Arnaldo Yamshita	Skip: Jason Chang; Third: Martin Yan; Second: Woody Cheng; Lead: Jacky Chung; Alternate: Ronnie Ma	Skip: P. N. Raju; Third: Girithar Anthay Suthakaran; Second: Sudheer Reedy; Lead: Kishan Vasant; Alternate: Vinay Goenka	Skip: Ian Robertson; Third: Andrew Walker; Second: Don Johnston; Lead: Luke Samuels
Kazakhstan	Kenya	Nigeria	Philippines
Skip: Abylaikhan Zhuzbay; Third: Madiyar Korabayev; Second: Aidos Alliyar; Lead: Ibragim Tastemir; Alternate: Arman Irjanov	Skip: Haggai Odhiambo Ogak; Third: Daniel Odhiambo; Second: Simon Karanja; Lead: Joseph Mwangi; Alternate: Evans Kinoti	Skip: Harold Woods III; Third: T. J. Cole; Second: Chad Johnson; Lead: Robert Brianne	Skip: Marc Pfister; Third: Christian Haller; Second: Enrico Pfister; Lead: Alan Frei; Alternate: Benjo Delarmente
Puerto Rico	Qatar	Saudi Arabia	
Skip: Jonathan Vargas; Third: Kyle Fisher; Second: Israel Acosta; Lead: Jose Sepulveda; Alternate: Emanuel Pappaterra	Skip: Nasser Alyafei; Third: Lajos Belleli; Second: Abdulrahman Mohsen; Lead: Mohammed Alnaimi	Skip: Amar Masalmeh; Third: Zayn Hagawi; Second: Mohammed Aldaraan; Lead: Munir Albeelbisi; Alternate: Suleiman Alaqel	

==== Round robin standings ====
Final Round Robin Standings

Key
Teams to Playoffs

Country	Skip	W	L	W–L	DSC
Philippines	Marc Pfister	10	0	–	41.26
Jamaica	Ian Robertson	8	2	1–0	106.15
Kazakhstan	Abylaikhan Zhuzbay	8	2	0–1	50.42
Hong Kong	Jason Chang	7	3	1–0	62.36
India	P. N. Raju	7	3	0–1	47.32
Brazil	Marcelo Cabral de Mello	4	6	–	87.75
Puerto Rico	Jonathan Vargas	3	7	1–1	106.41
Qatar	Nasser Alyafei	3	7	1–1	115.81
Saudi Arabia	Amar Masalmeh	3	7	1–1	147.86
Nigeria	Harold Woods III	2	8	–	125.25
Kenya	Haggai Odhiambo Ogak	0	10	–	155.51

Round Robin Summary Table
Pos.	Country	Brazil	Hong Kong	India	Jamaica	Kazakhstan	Kenya	Nigeria	Philippines	Puerto Rico	Qatar	Saudi Arabia	Record
6	Brazil	—	2–8	6–11	4–5	2–7	7–3	12–0	1–8	13–3	8–3	5–9	4–6
4	Hong Kong	8–2	—	9–2	5–9	6–7	9–1	9–4	4–9	10–5	10–2	11–2	7–3
5	India	11–6	2–9	—	11–5	5–10	15–0	12–3	2–10	11–5	8–3	12–5	7–3
2	Jamaica	5–4	9–5	5–11	—	9–8	11–0	W–L	5–7	7–4	8–6	11–3	8–2
3	Kazakhstan	7–2	7–6	10–5	8–9	—	17–0	12–3	5–6	11–3	9–4	9–2	8–2
11	Kenya	3–7	1–9	0–15	0–11	0–17	—	0–13	0–16	7–10	2–10	3–11	0–10
10	Nigeria	0–12	4–9	3–12	L–W	3–12	13–0	—	2–18	7–8	2–16	9–3	2–8
1	Philippines	8–1	9–4	10–2	7–5	6–5	16–0	18–2	—	11–2	12–1	15–0	10–0
7	Puerto Rico	3–13	5–10	5–11	4–7	3–11	10–7	8–7	2–11	—	7–8	10–7	3–7
8	Qatar	3–8	2–10	3–8	6–8	4–9	10–2	16–2	1–12	8–7	—	4–6	3–7
9	Saudi Arabia	9–5	2–11	5–12	3–11	2–9	11–3	3–9	0–15	7–10	6–4	—	3–7

==== Round robin results ====
===== Draw 1 =====
Saturday, October 26, 9:00

Sheet E	1	2	3	4	5	6	7	8	9	10	Final
Kazakhstan (Zhuzbay)	0	0	4	0	0	0	3	0	1	0	8
Jamaica (Robertson)	1	1	0	3	1	1	0	1	0	1	9

Sheet F	1	2	3	4	5	6	7	8	9	10	Final
Qatar (Alyafei)	1	0	1	0	0	0	1	0	X	X	3
Brazil (de Mello)	0	2	0	2	1	2	0	1	X	X	8

Sheet G	1	2	3	4	5	6	7	8	9	10	Final
Saudi Arabia (Masalmeh)	0	0	0	0	0	0	X	X	X	X	0
Philippines (Pfister)	3	3	2	2	3	2	X	X	X	X	15

Sheet H	1	2	3	4	5	6	7	8	9	10	Final
Puerto Rico (Vargas)	0	0	0	2	0	4	1	0	1	0	8
Nigeria (Woods III)	2	1	2	0	1	0	0	1	0	0	7

Sheet J	1	2	3	4	5	6	7	8	9	10	Final
Hong Kong (Chang)	1	1	0	3	1	3	X	X	X	X	9
Kenya (Odhiambo)	0	0	1	0	0	0	X	X	X	X	1

===== Draw 2 =====
Saturday, October 26, 19:00

Sheet E	1	2	3	4	5	6	7	8	9	10	Final
Brazil (de Mello)	3	0	3	3	3	1	X	X	X	X	13
Puerto Rico (Vargas)	0	3	0	0	0	0	X	X	X	X	3

Sheet F	1	2	3	4	5	6	7	8	9	10	Final
Hong Kong (Chang)	0	2	0	1	0	2	0	0	0	0	5
Jamaica (Robertson)	0	0	2	0	2	0	1	1	0	3	9

Sheet G	1	2	3	4	5	6	7	8	9	10	Final
Nigeria (Woods III)	0	0	0	1	0	2	0	X	X	X	3
Kazakhstan (Zhuzbay)	2	1	2	0	5	0	2	X	X	X	12

Sheet H	1	2	3	4	5	6	7	8	9	10	Final
Qatar (Alyafei)	0	3	2	1	3	1	0	X	X	X	10
Kenya (Odhiambo)	1	0	0	0	0	0	1	X	X	X	2

Sheet J	1	2	3	4	5	6	7	8	9	10	Final
Philippines (Pfister)	3	1	1	0	0	5	0	X	X	X	10
India (Raju)	0	0	0	1	0	0	1	X	X	X	2

===== Draw 3 =====
Sunday, October 27, 8:30

Sheet E	1	2	3	4	5	6	7	8	9	10	Final
Hong Kong (Chang)	5	0	1	0	1	0	1	0	1	X	9
Nigeria (Woods III)	0	1	0	1	0	1	0	1	0	X	4

Sheet F	1	2	3	4	5	6	7	8	9	10	Final
India (Raju)	0	1	0	0	3	0	3	0	4	X	11
Puerto Rico (Vargas)	2	0	1	1	0	0	0	1	0	X	5

Sheet G	1	2	3	4	5	6	7	8	9	10	Final
Kenya (Odhiambo)	0	0	0	0	0	0	0	X	X	X	0
Jamaica (Robertson)	2	2	1	3	1	1	1	X	X	X	11

Sheet H	1	2	3	4	5	6	7	8	9	10	Final
Brazil (de Mello)	1	0	0	0	1	0	0	0	X	X	2
Kazakhstan (Zhuzbay)	0	1	0	1	0	2	2	1	X	X	7

Sheet J	1	2	3	4	5	6	7	8	9	10	Final
Saudi Arabia (Masalmeh)	0	1	0	1	0	2	0	1	0	1	6
Qatar (Alyafei)	1	0	0	0	1	0	1	0	1	0	4

===== Draw 4 =====
Sunday, October 27, 19:30

Sheet E	1	2	3	4	5	6	7	8	9	10	Final
Kenya (Odhiambo)	0	0	0	0	0	0	X	X	X	X	0
India (Raju)	3	1	3	3	2	3	X	X	X	X	15

Sheet F	1	2	3	4	5	6	7	8	9	10	Final
Nigeria (Woods III)	0	0	0	0	2	0	0	X	X	X	2
Philippines (Pfister)	6	4	1	3	0	1	3	X	X	X	18

Sheet G	1	2	3	4	5	6	7	8	9	10	Final
Puerto Rico (Vargas)	0	0	2	0	1	0	1	2	0	1	7
Qatar (Alyafei)	2	1	0	1	0	1	0	0	3	0	8

Sheet H	1	2	3	4	5	6	7	8	9	10	Final
Saudi Arabia (Masalmeh)	1	0	0	0	0	1	0	X	X	X	2
Hong Kong (Chang)	0	2	0	2	1	0	6	X	X	X	11

Sheet J	1	2	3	4	5	6	7	8	9	10	11	Final
Jamaica (Robertson)	0	0	1	0	0	1	0	0	2	0	1	5
Brazil (de Mello)	0	1	0	1	0	0	0	1	0	1	0	4

===== Draw 5 =====
Monday, October 28, 9:00

Sheet E	1	2	3	4	5	6	7	8	9	10	Final
Qatar (Alyafei)	0	0	0	0	0	0	1	X	X	X	1
Philippines (Pfister)	0	2	2	4	2	2	0	X	X	X	12

Sheet F	1	2	3	4	5	6	7	8	9	10	Final
Kenya (Odhiambo)	1	1	1	0	0	0	0	0	0	X	3
Saudi Arabia (Masalmeh)	0	0	0	4	1	3	1	1	1	X	11

Sheet G	1	2	3	4	5	6	7	8	9	10	Final
Hong Kong (Chang)	0	0	3	0	1	2	2	X	X	X	8
Brazil (de Mello)	0	1	0	1	0	0	0	X	X	X	2

Sheet H	1	2	3	4	5	6	7	8	9	10	Final
India (Raju)	0	1	0	2	0	0	2	6	X	X	11
Jamaica (Robertson)	2	0	1	0	0	2	0	0	X	X	5

Sheet J	1	2	3	4	5	6	7	8	9	10	Final
Kazakhstan (Zhuzbay)	1	2	0	5	2	1	X	X	X	X	11
Puerto Rico (Vargas)	0	0	3	0	0	0	X	X	X	X	3

===== Draw 6 =====
Monday, October 28, 19:00

Sheet E	1	2	3	4	5	6	7	8	9	10	Final
Jamaica (Robertson)	0	0	2	1	1	2	1	4	X	X	11
Saudi Arabia (Masalmeh)	1	2	0	0	0	0	0	0	X	X	3

Sheet F	1	2	3	4	5	6	7	8	9	10	Final
Kazakhstan (Zhuzbay)	1	0	0	0	2	1	0	0	1	2	7
Hong Kong (Chang)	0	2	1	1	0	0	1	1	0	0	6

Sheet G	1	2	3	4	5	6	7	8	9	10	Final
Qatar (Alyafei)	0	0	0	2	0	0	1	0	X	X	3
India (Raju)	2	0	0	0	3	1	0	2	X	X	8

Sheet H	1	2	3	4	5	6	7	8	9	10	Final
Philippines (Pfister)	0	4	3	2	2	0	X	X	X	X	11
Puerto Rico (Vargas)	1	0	0	0	0	1	X	X	X	X	2

Sheet J	1	2	3	4	5	6	7	8	9	10	Final
Kenya (Odhiambo)	0	0	0	0	0	0	X	X	X	X	0
Nigeria (Woods III)	2	0	3	3	4	1	X	X	X	X	13

===== Draw 7 =====
Tuesday, October 29, 14:00

Sheet E	1	2	3	4	5	6	7	8	9	10	Final
India (Raju)	2	0	0	1	0	0	2	0	X	X	5
Kazakhstan (Zhuzbay)	0	0	2	0	2	3	0	3	X	X	10

Sheet F	1	2	3	4	5	6	7	8	9	10	Final
Saudi Arabia (Masalmeh)	0	1	0	0	0	0	1	1	0	X	3
Nigeria (Woods III)	1	0	1	1	1	2	0	0	3	X	9

Sheet G	1	2	3	4	5	6	7	8	9	10	Final
Jamaica (Robertson)	1	0	3	0	0	1	1	1	0	X	7
Puerto Rico (Vargas)	0	1	0	1	1	0	0	0	1	X	4

Sheet H	1	2	3	4	5	6	7	8	9	10	Final
Hong Kong (Chang)	2	1	0	3	0	2	2	X	X	X	10
Qatar (Alyafei)	0	0	1	0	1	0	0	X	X	X	2

Sheet J	1	2	3	4	5	6	7	8	9	10	Final
Brazil (de Mello)	0	1	0	0	0	0	0	X	X	X	1
Philippines (Pfister)	2	0	0	1	3	1	1	X	X	X	8

===== Draw 8 =====
Wednesday, October 30, 9:00

Sheet E	1	2	3	4	5	6	7	8	9	10	Final
Nigeria (Woods III)	0	1	0	1	0	0	X	X	X	X	2
Qatar (Alyafei)	3	0	4	0	8	1	X	X	X	X	16

Sheet F	1	2	3	4	5	6	7	8	9	10	Final
Brazil (de Mello)	0	1	0	3	1	0	0	1	0	X	6
India (Raju)	1	0	2	0	0	2	3	0	3	X	11

Sheet G	1	2	3	4	5	6	7	8	9	10	Final
Kazakhstan (Zhuzbay)	3	4	4	2	3	1	X	X	X	X	17
Kenya (Odhiambo)	0	0	0	0	0	0	X	X	X	X	0

Sheet H	1	2	3	4	5	6	7	8	9	10	Final
Jamaica (Robertson)	1	0	0	1	0	1	1	0	1	0	5
Philippines (Pfister)	0	0	2	0	2	0	0	2	0	1	7

Sheet J	1	2	3	4	5	6	7	8	9	10	Final
Puerto Rico (Vargas)	0	1	0	3	0	2	0	0	2	2	10
Saudi Arabia (Masalmeh)	1	0	0	0	1	0	3	2	0	0	7

===== Draw 9 =====
Wednesday, October 30, 19:00

Sheet E	1	2	3	4	5	6	7	8	9	10	Final
Philippines (Pfister)	3	3	2	3	3	2	X	X	X	X	16
Kenya (Odhiambo)	0	0	0	0	0	0	X	X	X	X	0

Sheet F	1	2	3	4	5	6	7	8	9	10	Final
Jamaica (Robertson)	0	0	1	0	0	3	1	1	1	1	8
Qatar (Alyafei)	2	1	0	2	1	0	0	0	0	0	6

Sheet G	1	2	3	4	5	6	7	8	9	10	Final
Brazil (de Mello)	3	3	1	1	3	1	X	X	X	X	12
Nigeria (Woods III)	0	0	0	0	0	0	X	X	X	X	0

Sheet H	1	2	3	4	5	6	7	8	9	10	Final
Kazakhstan (Zhuzbay)	2	1	4	0	2	0	X	X	X	X	9
Saudi Arabia (Masalmeh)	0	0	0	1	0	1	X	X	X	X	2

Sheet J	1	2	3	4	5	6	7	8	9	10	Final
India (Raju)	0	1	0	0	0	1	0	0	X	X	2
Hong Kong (Chang)	4	0	1	1	1	0	1	1	X	X	9

===== Draw 10 =====
Thursday, October 31, 9:00

Sheet E	1	2	3	4	5	6	7	8	9	10	Final
Saudi Arabia (Masalmeh)	0	0	4	1	0	2	0	1	1	X	9
Brazil (de Mello)	1	3	0	0	1	0	0	0	0	X	5

Sheet F	1	2	3	4	5	6	7	8	9	10	Final
Puerto Rico (Vargas)	0	0	0	2	1	0	3	1	1	2	10
Kenya (Odhiambo)	1	4	1	0	0	1	0	0	0	0	7

Sheet G	1	2	3	4	5	6	7	8	9	10	Final
Philippines (Pfister)	2	1	0	2	0	2	0	0	2	X	9
Hong Kong (Chang)	0	0	1	0	1	0	2	0	0	X	4

Sheet H	1	2	3	4	5	6	7	8	9	10	Final
Nigeria (Woods III)	0	2	0	1	0	0	X	X	X	X	3
India (Raju)	3	0	3	0	3	3	X	X	X	X	12

Sheet J	1	2	3	4	5	6	7	8	9	10	Final
Qatar (Alyafei)	0	1	0	0	2	0	1	0	X	X	4
Kazakhstan (Zhuzbay)	1	0	4	1	0	1	0	2	X	X	9

===== Draw 11 =====
Thursday, October 31, 19:00

Sheet E	1	2	3	4	5	6	7	8	9	10	Final
Puerto Rico (Vargas)	0	0	1	2	0	0	2	0	X	X	5
Hong Kong (Chang)	1	4	0	0	1	1	0	3	X	X	10

Sheet F	1	2	3	4	5	6	7	8	9	10	Final
Philippines (Pfister)	0	2	0	1	0	1	0	0	0	2	6
Kazakhstan (Zhuzbay)	1	0	1	0	1	0	0	1	1	0	5

Sheet G	1	2	3	4	5	6	7	8	9	10	Final
India (Raju)	1	1	0	2	0	2	0	6	X	X	12
Saudi Arabia (Masalmeh)	0	0	3	0	1	0	1	0	X	X	5

Sheet H	1	2	3	4	5	6	7	8	9	10	Final
Kenya (Odhiambo)	1	0	1	0	1	0	X	X	X	X	3
Brazil (de Mello)	0	1	0	3	0	3	X	X	X	X	7

Sheet J	1	2	3	4	5	6	7	8	9	10	Final
Nigeria (Woods III)	0	0	0	0	0	/					L^
Jamaica (Robertson)	3	4	1	2	3						W

^A player on Nigeria was injured during the fifth end, resulting in a forfeit.

==== Playoffs ====
Semifinals
1	Philippines	6
4	Hong Kong	1
2	Jamaica	3
3	Kazakhstan	10

Gold medal game
1	Philippines	9
3	Kazakhstan	3
Bronze medal game
4	Hong Kong	8
2	Jamaica	7

===== Semifinals =====
Friday, November 1, 19:00

Sheet E	1	2	3	4	5	6	7	8	9	10	Final
Jamaica (Robertson)	1	0	0	0	0	0	1	1	X	X	3
Kazakhstan (Zhuzbay)	0	2	2	2	2	2	0	0	X	X	10

Sheet G	1	2	3	4	5	6	7	8	9	10	Final
Philippines (Pfister)	0	2	0	1	0	0	1	2	X	X	6
Hong Kong (Chang)	0	0	0	0	1	0	0	0	X	X	1

===== Bronze medal game =====
Saturday, November 2, 10:00

Sheet F	1	2	3	4	5	6	7	8	9	10	Final
Hong Kong (Chang)	0	0	2	0	4	0	0	1	0	1	8
Jamaica (Robertson)	0	0	0	1	0	2	2	0	2	0	7

===== Gold medal game =====
Saturday, November 2, 14:00

Sheet F	1	2	3	4	5	6	7	8	9	10	Final
Philippines (Pfister)	3	1	0	1	0	1	0	2	1	X	9
Kazakhstan (Zhuzbay)	0	0	1	0	1	0	1	0	0	X	3

==== Final standings ====
Key
Team Promoted to 2025 A Division

Place	Team
1st place, gold medalist(s)	Philippines
2nd place, silver medalist(s)	Kazakhstan
3rd place, bronze medalist(s)	Hong Kong
4	Jamaica
5	India
6	Brazil
7	Puerto Rico
8	Qatar
9	Saudi Arabia
10	Nigeria
11	Kenya

== Women ==
=== A division ===
==== Qualification ====
The following nations qualified to participate in the 2024 Pan Continental Curling Championship A Division:

Event	Vacancies	Qualified
2023 Pan Continental Curling Championships A Division	7	South Korea; Japan; United States; Canada; New Zealand; Chinese Taipei; Mexico
2023 Pan Continental Curling Championships B Division	1	China
TOTAL	8	

==== Teams ====
The teams are listed as follows:

Canada	China	Chinese Taipei	Japan
Skip: Rachel Homan; Third: Tracy Fleury; Second: Emma Miskew; Lead: Sarah Wilkes; Alternate: Rachelle Brown	Skip: Wang Rui; Third: Han Yu; Second: Dong Ziqi; Lead: Jiang Jiayi; Alternate: Su Tingyu	Skip: Yang Ko; Third: Stephanie Lee; Second: Liu I-Ling; Lead: Chang Chia-Chi; Alternate: Lee Ming-Chieh	Skip: Miyu Ueno; Third: Yui Ueno; Second: Junko Nishimuro; Lead: Asuka Kanai; Alternate: Kaho Onodera
Mexico	New Zealand	South Korea	United States
Skip: Adriana Camarena; Third: Karla Knepper; Second: Veronica Huerta; Lead: Karla Martínez; Alternate: Estefana Quintero	Skip: Chelsea Suddens; Third: Eleanor Heald; Second: Sophie Tran; Lead: Ariel Weber; Alternate: Grace Apuwai-Bishop	Skip: Gim Eun-ji; Third: Kim Min-ji; Second: Kim Su-ji; Lead: Seol Ye-eun; Alternate: Seol Ye-ji	Skip: Cory Thiesse; Third: Vicky Persinger; Second: Tara Peterson; Lead: Taylor Anderson-Heide; Alternate: Aileen Geving

==== Round robin standings ====
Final Round Robin Standings

Key
Teams to Playoffs and Qualified for the 2025 World Women's Curling Championship
Team Qualified for the 2025 World Women's Curling Championship
Team Relegated to 2025 B Division

Country	Skip	W	L	W–L	PF	PA	EW	EL	BE	SE	S%	DSC
Canada	Rachel Homan	7	0	–	64	18	31	15	2	12	86.1%	15.88
Japan	Miyu Ueno	6	1	–	59	31	34	22	4	9	83.1%	25.50
South Korea	Gim Eun-ji	5	2	–	56	32	28	21	3	10	82.1%	16.18
China	Wang Rui	4	3	–	59	33	31	20	2	14	81.6%	42.73
United States	Cory Thiesse	3	4	–	54	38	29	22	2	15	81.8%	26.54
New Zealand	Chelsea Suddens	2	5	–	35	56	23	28	3	7	60.7%	60.86
Mexico	Adriana Camarena	1	6	–	28	74	17	36	1	3	51.0%	83.40
Chinese Taipei	Yang Ko	0	7	–	15	88	9	38	1	0	42.5%	88.11

Round Robin Summary Table
Pos.	Country	Canada	China	Chinese Taipei	Japan	Mexico	New Zealand	South Korea	United States	Record
1	Canada	—	7–5	13–0	8–6	10–1	9–2	8–2	9–2	7–0
4	China	5–7	—	14–2	6–11	14–0	9–4	2–5	9–4	4–3
8	Chinese Taipei	0–13	2–14	—	1–12	8–9	3–10	1–11	0–19	0–7
2	Japan	6–8	11–6	12–1	—	11–3	7–4	6–4	6–5	6–1
7	Mexico	1–10	0–14	9–8	3–11	—	9–10	4–11	2–10	1–6
6	New Zealand	2–9	4–9	10–3	4–7	10–9	—	3–13	2–6	2–5
3	South Korea	2–8	5–2	11–1	4–6	11–4	13–3	—	10–8	5–2
5	United States	2–9	4–9	19–0	5–6	10–2	6–2	8–10	—	3–4

==== Round robin results ====
All draw times are listed in Mountain Time (UTC−06:00).

===== Draw 1 =====
Sunday, October 27, 13:30

Sheet A	1	2	3	4	5	6	7	8	9	10	Final
United States (Thiesse)	0	0	0	1	1	0	X	X	X	X	2
Canada (Homan)	3	0	3	0	0	3	X	X	X	X	9

Sheet B	1	2	3	4	5	6	7	8	9	10	Final
Mexico (Camarena)	0	1	1	0	2	0	2	1	0	2	9
Chinese Taipei (Yang)	1	0	0	3	0	2	0	0	2	0	8

Sheet C	1	2	3	4	5	6	7	8	9	10	Final
South Korea (Gim)	0	0	0	2	0	0	1	1	0	1	5
China (Wang)	0	0	1	0	0	1	0	0	0	0	2

Sheet D	1	2	3	4	5	6	7	8	9	10	Final
New Zealand (Suddens)	0	1	0	0	0	1	0	2	0	X	4
Japan (Ueno)	1	0	0	2	0	0	2	0	2	X	7

===== Draw 2 =====
Monday, October 28, 9:00

Sheet A	1	2	3	4	5	6	7	8	9	10	Final
China (Wang)	0	0	3	0	2	0	0	1	0	X	6
Japan (Ueno)	2	2	0	2	0	0	3	0	2	X	11

Sheet B	1	2	3	4	5	6	7	8	9	10	Final
South Korea (Gim)	5	3	3	0	2	0	X	X	X	X	13
New Zealand (Suddens)	0	0	0	2	0	1	X	X	X	X	3

Sheet C	1	2	3	4	5	6	7	8	9	10	Final
Canada (Homan)	5	2	1	1	3	1	X	X	X	X	13
Chinese Taipei (Yang)	0	0	0	0	0	0	X	X	X	X	0

Sheet D	1	2	3	4	5	6	7	8	9	10	Final
United States (Thiesse)	0	2	3	2	3	0	X	X	X	X	10
Mexico (Camarena)	1	0	0	0	0	1	X	X	X	X	2

===== Draw 3 =====
Monday, October 28, 19:00

Sheet A	1	2	3	4	5	6	7	8	9	10	Final
South Korea (Gim)	2	4	2	1	0	2	X	X	X	X	11
Chinese Taipei (Yang)	0	0	0	0	1	0	X	X	X	X	1

Sheet B	1	2	3	4	5	6	7	8	9	10	11	Final
United States (Thiesse)	0	1	0	1	1	0	1	0	0	1	0	5
Japan (Ueno)	0	0	2	0	0	2	0	1	0	0	1	6

Sheet C	1	2	3	4	5	6	7	8	9	10	11	Final
New Zealand (Suddens)	1	2	1	1	2	0	1	0	1	0	1	10
Mexico (Camarena)	0	0	0	0	0	1	0	4	0	4	0	9

Sheet D	1	2	3	4	5	6	7	8	9	10	Final
Canada (Homan)	3	0	1	0	0	1	0	1	0	1	7
China (Wang)	0	1	0	2	0	0	1	0	1	0	5

===== Draw 4 =====
Tuesday, October 29, 14:00

Sheet A	1	2	3	4	5	6	7	8	9	10	Final
Mexico (Camarena)	0	0	0	0	0	0	X	X	X	X	0
China (Wang)	2	3	3	1	5	0	X	X	X	X	14

Sheet B	1	2	3	4	5	6	7	8	9	10	Final
New Zealand (Suddens)	0	0	0	0	2	0	X	X	X	X	2
Canada (Homan)	3	2	0	3	0	1	X	X	X	X	9

Sheet C	1	2	3	4	5	6	7	8	9	10	Final
United States (Thiesse)	0	0	1	1	0	4	0	2	0	0	8
South Korea (Gim)	0	2	0	0	2	0	1	0	3	2	10

Sheet D	1	2	3	4	5	6	7	8	9	10	Final
Japan (Ueno)	6	1	0	2	1	2	X	X	X	X	12
Chinese Taipei (Yang)	0	0	1	0	0	0	X	X	X	X	1

===== Draw 5 =====
Wednesday, October 30, 9:00

Sheet A	1	2	3	4	5	6	7	8	9	10	Final
New Zealand (Suddens)	0	0	0	1	0	0	0	1	X	X	2
United States (Thiesse)	1	1	0	0	2	1	1	0	X	X	6

Sheet B	1	2	3	4	5	6	7	8	9	10	Final
Chinese Taipei (Yang)	0	0	2	0	0	0	0	X	X	X	2
China (Wang)	3	4	0	1	2	0	4	X	X	X	14

Sheet C	1	2	3	4	5	6	7	8	9	10	Final
Mexico (Camarena)	0	0	0	1	0	2	0	X	X	X	3
Japan (Ueno)	2	2	1	0	4	0	2	X	X	X	11

Sheet D	1	2	3	4	5	6	7	8	9	10	Final
South Korea (Gim)	0	0	0	1	0	1	X	X	X	X	2
Canada (Homan)	0	2	3	0	3	0	X	X	X	X	8

===== Draw 6 =====
Wednesday, October 30, 19:00

Sheet A	1	2	3	4	5	6	7	8	9	10	Final
Canada (Homan)	3	1	0	2	3	1	X	X	X	X	10
Mexico (Camarena)	0	0	1	0	0	0	X	X	X	X	1

Sheet B	1	2	3	4	5	6	7	8	9	10	Final
Japan (Ueno)	1	1	0	1	1	0	0	1	0	1	6
South Korea (Gim)	0	0	1	0	0	2	0	0	1	0	4

Sheet C	1	2	3	4	5	6	7	8	9	10	Final
Chinese Taipei (Yang)	0	0	0	0	0	0	X	X	X	X	0
United States (Thiesse)	7	1	1	3	5	2	X	X	X	X	19

Sheet D	1	2	3	4	5	6	7	8	9	10	Final
China (Wang)	0	1	3	2	0	1	1	1	X	X	9
New Zealand (Suddens)	1	0	0	0	3	0	0	0	X	X	4

===== Draw 7 =====
Thursday, October 31, 14:00

Sheet A	1	2	3	4	5	6	7	8	9	10	Final
Chinese Taipei (Yang)	0	0	2	0	1	0	0	X	X	X	3
New Zealand (Suddens)	4	1	0	1	0	2	2	X	X	X	10

Sheet B	1	2	3	4	5	6	7	8	9	10	Final
China (Wang)	1	1	0	2	0	1	0	2	2	X	9
United States (Thiesse)	0	0	1	0	2	0	1	0	0	X	4

Sheet C	1	2	3	4	5	6	7	8	9	10	Final
Japan (Ueno)	1	0	1	0	2	0	1	0	1	0	6
Canada (Homan)	0	1	0	3	0	2	0	1	0	1	8

Sheet D	1	2	3	4	5	6	7	8	9	10	Final
Mexico (Camarena)	0	0	1	1	0	2	0	0	X	X	4
South Korea (Gim)	2	4	0	0	2	0	1	2	X	X	11

==== Playoffs ====
Semifinals
1	Canada	6
4	China	5
2	Japan	6
3	South Korea	7

Gold medal game
1	Canada	6
3	South Korea	5
Bronze medal game
4	China	7
2	Japan	3

===== Semifinals =====
Friday, November 1, 9:00

Sheet A	1	2	3	4	5	6	7	8	9	10	11	Final
Canada (Homan)	0	1	0	1	0	1	0	0	2	0	1	6
China (Wang)	0	0	0	0	2	0	0	1	0	2	0	5

Player percentages
Canada		China	
Sarah Wilkes	85%	Jiang Jiayi	91%
Emma Miskew	81%	Dong Ziqi	75%
Tracy Fleury	95%	Han Yu	90%
Rachel Homan	80%	Wang Rui	85%
Total	85%	Total	85%

Sheet C	1	2	3	4	5	6	7	8	9	10	Final
Japan (Ueno)	0	2	1	0	0	1	1	0	1	0	6
South Korea (Gim)	0	0	0	3	1	0	0	2	0	1	7

Player percentages
Japan		South Korea	
Asuka Kanai	85%	Seol Ye-eun	81%
Kaho Onodera	73%	Kim Su-ji	83%
Yui Ueno	78%	Kim Min-ji	81%
Miyu Ueno	80%	Gim Eun-ji	78%
Total	79%	Total	81%

===== Bronze medal game =====
Friday, November 1, 19:00

Sheet B	1	2	3	4	5	6	7	8	9	10	Final
China (Wang)	0	2	0	0	0	0	2	1	2	X	7
Japan (Ueno)	1	0	0	1	0	1	0	0	0	X	3

Player percentages
China		Japan	
Jiang Jiayi	99%	Asuka Kanai	86%
Dong Ziqi	76%	Junko Nishimuro	75%
Han Yu	85%	Yui Ueno	84%
Wang Rui	78%	Miyu Ueno	71%
Total	85%	Total	79%

===== Gold medal game =====
Saturday, November 2, 15:00

Sheet B	1	2	3	4	5	6	7	8	9	10	Final
Canada (Homan)	2	0	0	0	1	0	1	0	1	1	6
South Korea (Gim)	0	2	0	0	0	1	0	2	0	0	5

Player percentages
Canada		South Korea	
Sarah Wilkes	88%	Seol Ye-eun	89%
Emma Miskew	85%	Kim Su-ji	76%
Tracy Fleury	78%	Kim Min-ji	78%
Rachel Homan	89%	Gim Eun-ji	75%
Total	85%	Total	79%

==== Player percentages ====
Round robin only

Leads	%
(China) Jiang Jiayi	91.1
(South Korea) Seol Ye-eun	89.5
(Canada) Sarah Wilkes	88.5
(United States) Taylor Anderson-Heide	87.9
(Japan) Asuka Kanai	87.9

Seconds	%
(United States) Tara Peterson	84.6
(Canada) Emma Miskew	84.3
(South Korea) Kim Su-ji	83.9
(Japan) Junko Nishimuro	81.6
(China) Dong Ziqi	80.5

Thirds	%
(Canada) Tracy Fleury	86.4
(South Korea) Kim Min-ji	83.3
(China) Han Yu	81.4
(United States) Vicky Persinger	79.2
(Japan) Yui Ueno	77.0

Skips	%
(Canada) Rachel Homan	87.1
(Japan) Miyu Ueno	82.3
(United States) Cory Thiesse	76.6
(South Korea) Gim Eun-ji	73.4
(China) Wang Rui	73.3

==== Final standings ====
Key
Teams Advance to the 2025 World Women's Curling Championship
Team Relegated to 2025 B Division

Place	Team
1st place, gold medalist(s)	Canada
2nd place, silver medalist(s)	South Korea
3rd place, bronze medalist(s)	China
4	Japan
5	United States
6	New Zealand
7	Mexico
8	Chinese Taipei

=== B division ===
==== Teams ====
The teams are listed as follows:

Australia	Brazil	Hong Kong	Jamaica
Skip: Helen Williams; Third: Sara Westman; Second: Karen Titheridge; Lead: Kristin Tsourlenes; Alternate: Michelle Fredericks-Armstrong	Skip: Isis Regadas Abreu; Third: Luciana Barrella; Second: Marcelia Melo; Lead: Ana Teodoro; Alternate: Rafaela Ladeira	Skip: Ling-Yue Hung; Third: Ada Shang; Second: May Yam; Lead: Helen Li	Fourth: Madeleine Spurgeon; Third: Stephanie Chen; Skip: Margot Shepherd-Spurgeon; Lead: Alexandra Marriott; Alternate: Theresa Chen
Kazakhstan	Kenya	Nigeria	Philippines
Fourth: Tilsimay Alliyarova; Third: Yekaterina Kolykhalova; Skip: Angelina Ebauyer; Lead: Merey Tastemir; Alternate: Yana Ebauyer	Skip: Laventer Oguta; Third: Rose Obilo; Second: Kyra Sheri Kemu; Lead: Grace Kimathi	Skip: Jasmin Hashi; Third: Anteequa Washington; Second: Kiana McKoy	Skip: Kathleen Dubberstein; Third: Leilani Dubberstein; Second: Roselle Colisao; Lead: Sheila Mariano; Alternate: Anne Marie Bonache

==== Round robin standings ====
Final Round Robin Standings

Key
Teams to Playoffs

Country	Skip	W	L	W–L	DSC
Australia	Helen Williams	6	1	1–0	57.08
Kazakhstan	Angelina Ebauyer	6	1	0–1	43.97
Jamaica	Margot Shepherd-Spurgeon	5	2	1–0	80.22
Philippines	Kathleen Dubberstein	5	2	0–1	70.58
Brazil	Isis Regadas Abreu	3	4	–	104.60
Hong Kong	Ling-Yue Hung	2	5	–	96.89
Nigeria	Jasmin Hashi	1	6	–	133.37
Kenya	Laventer Oguta	0	7	–	161.34

Round Robin Summary Table
Pos.	Country	Australia	Brazil	Hong Kong	Jamaica	Kazakhstan	Kenya	Nigeria	Philippines	Record
1	Australia	—	11–3	9–1	5–4	8–7	13–1	9–1	4–6	6–1
5	Brazil	3–11	—	11–5	5–6	1–15	17–1	10–3	9–13	3–4
6	Hong Kong	1–9	5–11	—	5–8	6–11	14–1	13–7	4–8	2–5
3	Jamaica	4–5	6–5	8–5	—	4–7	18–1	15–4	13–11	5–2
2	Kazakhstan	7–8	15–1	11–6	7–4	—	14–1	W–L	8–7	6–1
8	Kenya	1–13	1–17	1–14	1–18	1–14	—	7–8	2–19	0–7
7	Nigeria	1–9	3–10	7–13	4–15	L–W	8–7	—	L–W	1–6
4	Philippines	6–4	13–9	8–4	11–13	7–8	19–2	W–L	—	5–2

==== Round robin results ====
===== Draw 1 =====
Saturday, October 26, 14:00

Sheet E	Final
Nigeria (Hashi)	L
Philippines (Dubberstein)	W

Sheet F	1	2	3	4	5	6	7	8	9	10	Final
Australia (Williams)	4	0	0	1	0	0	2	0	0	1	8
Kazakhstan (Ebauyer)	0	0	2	0	1	1	0	0	3	0	7

Sheet G	1	2	3	4	5	6	7	8	9	10	Final
Kenya (Oguta)	0	0	1	0	0	0	X	X	X	X	1
Brazil (Regadas Abreu)	1	4	0	4	4	4	X	X	X	X	17

Sheet H	1	2	3	4	5	6	7	8	9	10	Final
Jamaica (Shepherd-Spurgeon)	1	0	0	0	3	0	0	0	4	X	8
Hong Kong (Hung)	0	1	1	2	0	1	0	0	0	X	5

===== Draw 2 =====
Sunday, October 27, 13:30

Sheet E	1	2	3	4	5	6	7	8	9	10	11	Final
Brazil (Regadas Abreu)	0	0	1	0	1	0	0	1	1	1	0	5
Jamaica (Shepherd-Spurgeon)	1	1	0	0	0	2	1	0	0	0	1	6

Sheet F	1	2	3	4	5	6	7	8	9	10	Final
Kenya (Oguta)	0	0	0	0	0	1	X	X	X	X	1
Hong Kong (Hung)	3	3	1	3	4	0	X	X	X	X	14

Sheet G	Final
Kazakhstan (Ebauyer)	W
Nigeria (Hashi)	L

Sheet H	1	2	3	4	5	6	7	8	9	10	Final
Australia (Williams)	0	0	1	1	0	1	0	1	0	0	4
Philippines (Dubberstein)	0	0	0	0	2	0	2	0	1	1	6

===== Draw 3 =====
Monday, October 28, 14:00

Sheet E	1	2	3	4	5	6	7	8	9	10	Final
Hong Kong (Hung)	0	1	0	2	0	1	0	2	0	X	6
Kazakhstan (Ebauyer)	2	0	4	0	1	0	1	0	3	X	11

Sheet F	1	2	3	4	5	6	7	8	9	10	Final
Jamaica (Shepherd-Spurgeon)	0	0	0	0	1	0	1	1	1	0	4
Australia (Williams)	0	1	0	2	0	0	0	0	0	2	5

Sheet G	1	2	3	4	5	6	7	8	9	10	Final
Philippines (Dubberstein)	5	1	0	3	3	2	0	5	X	X	19
Kenya (Oguta)	0	0	1	0	0	0	1	0	X	X	2

Sheet H	1	2	3	4	5	6	7	8	9	10	Final
Nigeria (Hashi)	0	1	0	0	0	0	0	2	0	X	3
Brazil (Regadas Abreu)	2	0	0	1	1	4	1	0	1	X	10

===== Draw 4 =====
Tuesday, October 29, 9:00

Sheet E	1	2	3	4	5	6	7	8	9	10	Final
Kenya (Oguta)	0	1	0	0	1	1	0	3	1	0	7
Nigeria (Hashi)	1	0	1	2	0	0	3	0	0	1	8

Sheet F	1	2	3	4	5	6	7	8	9	10	11	Final
Brazil (Regadas Abreu)	5	0	1	1	0	0	0	0	0	2	0	9
Philippines (Dubberstein)	0	2	0	0	1	2	1	3	0	0	4	13

Sheet G	1	2	3	4	5	6	7	8	9	10	Final
Australia (Williams)	1	1	0	0	5	1	1	X	X	X	9
Hong Kong (Hung)	0	0	1	0	0	0	0	X	X	X	1

Sheet H	1	2	3	4	5	6	7	8	9	10	Final
Kazakhstan (Ebauyer)	0	2	0	0	0	2	1	0	1	1	7
Jamaica (Shepherd-Spurgeon)	0	0	1	2	0	0	0	1	0	0	4

===== Draw 5 =====
Tuesday, October 29, 19:00

Sheet E	1	2	3	4	5	6	7	8	9	10	Final
Philippines (Dubberstein)	2	2	0	0	1	1	0	2	0	X	8
Hong Kong (Hung)	0	0	2	2	0	0	0	0	0	X	4

Sheet F	1	2	3	4	5	6	7	8	9	10	Final
Nigeria (Hashi)	1	0	0	0	0	3	0	X	X	X	4
Jamaica (Shepherd-Spurgeon)	0	2	4	2	4	0	3	X	X	X	15

Sheet G	1	2	3	4	5	6	7	8	9	10	Final
Brazil (Regadas Abreu)	0	0	0	1	0	0	X	X	X	X	1
Kazakhstan (Ebauyer)	2	3	5	0	2	3	X	X	X	X	15

Sheet H	1	2	3	4	5	6	7	8	9	10	Final
Kenya (Oguta)	0	0	0	0	1	0	X	X	X	X	1
Australia (Williams)	4	4	1	1	0	3	X	X	X	X	13

===== Draw 6 =====
Wednesday, October 30, 14:00

Sheet E	1	2	3	4	5	6	7	8	9	10	Final
Australia (Williams)	2	0	1	2	2	0	0	4	X	X	11
Brazil (Regadas Abreu)	0	1	0	0	0	1	1	0	X	X	3

Sheet F	1	2	3	4	5	6	7	8	9	10	Final
Kazakhstan (Ebauyer)	3	0	1	1	4	5	X	X	X	X	14
Kenya (Oguta)	0	1	0	0	0	0	X	X	X	X	1

Sheet G	1	2	3	4	5	6	7	8	9	10	11	Final
Jamaica (Shepherd-Spurgeon)	0	3	0	1	2	0	2	0	3	0	2	13
Philippines (Dubberstein)	2	0	1	0	0	2	0	2	0	4	0	11

Sheet H	1	2	3	4	5	6	7	8	9	10	Final
Hong Kong (Hung)	0	0	1	4	0	0	3	0	5	X	13
Nigeria (Hashi)	2	2	0	0	1	1	0	1	0	X	7

===== Draw 7 =====
Thursday, October 31, 14:00

Sheet E	1	2	3	4	5	6	7	8	9	10	Final
Jamaica (Shepherd-Spurgeon)	1	3	6	3	5	0	X	X	X	X	18
Kenya (Oguta)	0	0	0	0	0	1	X	X	X	X	1

Sheet F	1	2	3	4	5	6	7	8	9	10	Final
Hong Kong (Hung)	0	1	0	0	0	2	2	0	0	0	5
Brazil (Regadas Abreu)	1	0	1	1	1	0	0	1	3	3	11

Sheet G	1	2	3	4	5	6	7	8	9	10	Final
Nigeria (Hashi)	0	0	1	0	0	0	X	X	X	X	1
Australia (Williams)	2	3	0	0	1	3	X	X	X	X	9

Sheet H	1	2	3	4	5	6	7	8	9	10	Final
Philippines (Dubberstein)	2	0	0	0	0	1	1	1	0	2	7
Kazakhstan (Ebauyer)	0	0	0	5	2	0	0	0	1	0	8

==== Playoffs ====
Semifinals
1	Australia	11
4	Philippines	6
2	Kazakhstan	8
3	Jamaica	9

Gold medal game
1	Australia	11
3	Jamaica	4
Bronze medal game
4	Philippines	4
2	Kazakhstan	10

===== Semifinal =====
Friday, November 1, 14:00

Sheet F	1	2	3	4	5	6	7	8	9	10	Final
Australia (Williams)	0	0	4	2	0	0	1	0	4	X	11
Philippines (Dubberstein)	0	2	0	0	1	1	0	2	0	X	6

Sheet H	1	2	3	4	5	6	7	8	9	10	Final
Kazakhstan (Ebauyer)	1	0	0	0	1	0	3	0	2	1	8
Jamaica (Shepherd-Spurgeon)	0	3	2	1	0	3	0	0	0	0	9

===== Bronze medal game =====
Saturday, November 2, 10:00

Sheet G	1	2	3	4	5	6	7	8	9	10	Final
Philippines (Dubberstein)	0	2	0	0	0	0	2	0	0	X	4
Kazakhstan (Ebauyer)	3	0	2	0	0	1	0	3	1	X	10

===== Gold medal game =====
Saturday, November 2, 14:00

Sheet G	1	2	3	4	5	6	7	8	9	10	Final
Australia (Williams)	1	1	2	0	2	1	0	0	4	X	11
Jamaica (Shepherd-Spurgeon)	0	0	0	1	0	0	2	1	0	X	4

==== Final standings ====
Key
Team Promoted to 2025 A Division

Place	Team
1st place, gold medalist(s)	Australia
2nd place, silver medalist(s)	Jamaica
3rd place, bronze medalist(s)	Kazakhstan
4	Philippines
5	Brazil
6	Hong Kong
7	Nigeria
8	Kenya
