= Curling at the 2025 Asian Winter Games – Men's team =

Men's team at the 2025 Asian Winter Games
- Venue: Pingfang Curling Arena
- Date: 9–14 February 2025
- Competitors: 54 from 11 nations

Medalists
gold medal	Philippines; Marc Pfister, Christian Haller, Enrico Pfister, Alan Frei, Benjo Delarmente
silver medal	South Korea; Lee Jae-beom, Kim Hyo-jun, Kim Eun-bin, Pyo Jeong-min, Kim Jin-hun
bronze medal	China; Xu Xiaoming, Fei Xueqing, Wang Zhiyu, Li Zhichao, Ye Jianjun

The men's team curling tournament at the 2025 Asian Winter Games was held in Harbin, China, between 9 and 14 February at the Harbin Pingfang District Curling Arena.

The Philippine national men's curling team won the first ever Asian Winter Games medal for their country by winning the final game against South Korea.

A total of 11 teams participated in the tournament.

== Squads ==
China	Chinese Taipei	Hong Kong	Japan
Xu Xiaoming; Fei Xueqing; Wang Zhiyu; Li Zhichao; Ye Jianjun	Lin Ting-li; Chang Che-lun; Lin Chen-han; Hou Yi-ler; Liu Bor-kai	Jason Chang; Martin Yan; Cheng Ching Nam; Chung Cheuk Hei; Ma Chi Lap	Ryo Aoki; Haruki Watanabe; Ayumu Hemmi; Osuke Miya; Rin Kyoto
Kazakhstan	Kyrgyzstan	Philippines	Qatar
Abylaikhan Zhuzbay; Aidos Alliyar; Adil Zhumagozha; Yermek Mussainov; Arman Irzhanov	Aibek Asanaliev; Iskhak Abykeev; Beksultan Myrzabaev; Mukhamed Dasifu	Marc Pfister; Christian Haller; Enrico Pfister; Alan Frei; Benjo Delarmente	Nasser Al-Yafei; Ahmed Al-Fahad; Abdulrahman Al-Yafei; Mohammed Al-Naimi; Mubarak Al-Marri
Saudi Arabia	South Korea	Thailand	
Munir Al-Beelbisi; Suleiman Al-Aqel; Mohammed Al-Daraan; Hussain Hagawi; Abdullah Al-Zahrani	Lee Jae-beom; Kim Hyo-jun; Kim Eun-bin; Pyo Jeong-min; Kim Jin-hun	Prawes Kaewjeen; Nuth Boonyaporn; Pongsak Mahattanasakul; Thepparit Riwin; Aongart Maneenet	

== Results ==
All times are China Standard Time (UTC+08:00)

=== Round robin ===
==== Group A ====
Pos	Team	Skip	Pld	W	L	W–L	PF	PA	DSC	Qualification
1	South Korea	Lee Jae-beom	4	4	0	—	43	5	83.43	Semifinals
2	Philippines	Marc Pfister	4	3	1	—	28	12	78.11	Qualification
3	Kazakhstan	Abylaikhan Zhuzbay	4	2	2	—	19	24	73.49	Qualification
4	Chinese Taipei	Lin Ting-li	4	1	3	—	16	35	108.93	
5	Kyrgyzstan	Aibek Asanaliev	4	0	4	—	10	40	77.01	

Source: Official website

9 February, 13:00

Sheet A	1	2	3	4	5	6	7	8	Final
South Korea 🔨	0	2	0	1	2	0	1	X	6
Philippines	0	0	0	0	0	1	0	X	1

Sheet E	1	2	3	4	5	6	7	8	Final
Chinese Taipei	0	4	0	0	0	0	1	X	5
Kazakhstan 🔨	3	0	3	1	1	2	0	X	10

9 February, 21:00

Sheet D	1	2	3	4	5	6	7	8	Final
Kyrgyzstan	0	0	0	1	0	0	X	X	1
South Korea 🔨	4	1	4	0	3	3	X	X	15

10 February, 9:00

Sheet D	1	2	3	4	5	6	7	8	Final
Kazakhstan	0	0	0	1	0	0	0	X	1
Philippines 🔨	0	0	2	0	0	0	2	X	4

10 February, 14:00

Sheet B	1	2	3	4	5	6	7	8	Final
South Korea 🔨	5	0	2	1	1	1	X	X	10
Chinese Taipei	0	1	0	0	0	0	X	X	1

10 February, 19:00

Sheet E	1	2	3	4	5	6	7	8	Final
Philippines 🔨	2	0	5	0	4	1	X	X	12
Kyrgyzstan	0	1	0	1	0	0	X	X	2

11 February, 14:00

Sheet A	1	2	3	4	5	6	7	8	Final
Chinese Taipei	1	0	2	0	2	2	0	X	7
Kyrgyzstan 🔨	0	2	0	1	0	0	1	X	4

Sheet C	1	2	3	4	5	6	7	8	Final
Kazakhstan 🔨	0	1	0	1	0	0	0	X	2
South Korea	1	0	1	0	2	4	4	X	12

12 February, 14:00

Sheet B	1	2	3	4	5	6	7	8	Final
Kyrgyzstan	0	1	0	1	0	0	1	X	3
Kazakhstan 🔨	1	0	3	0	1	1	0	X	6

Sheet C	1	2	3	4	5	6	7	8	Final
Philippines 🔨	4	2	0	3	0	2	X	X	11
Chinese Taipei	0	0	1	0	2	0	X	X	3

==== Group B ====
Pos	Team	Skip	Pld	W	L	W–L	PF	PA	DSC	Qualification
1	China	Xu Xiaoming	5	5	0	—	63	10	36.46	Semifinals
2	Hong Kong	Jason Chang	5	4	1	—	50	16	62.23	Qualification
3	Japan	Ryo Aoki	5	3	2	—	52	21	63.73	Qualification
4	Qatar	Nasser Al-Yafei	5	2	3	—	21	41	138.50	
5	Saudi Arabia	Munir Al-Beelbisi	5	1	4	—	22	55	128.47	
6	Thailand	Kaewjeen / Mahattanasakul	5	0	5	—	8	73	130.14	

Source: Official website

9 February, 13:00

Sheet B	1	2	3	4	5	6	7	8	Final
Thailand	0	0	0	0	0	0	X	X	0
Japan 🔨	3	5	3	4	3	5	X	X	23

Sheet C	1	2	3	4	5	6	7	8	Final
China 🔨	3	0	0	2	2	2	0	X	9
Hong Kong	0	0	1	0	0	0	1	X	2

Sheet D	1	2	3	4	5	6	7	8	Final
Qatar	3	2	1	0	3	0	1	X	10
Saudi Arabia 🔨	0	0	0	2	0	2	0	X	4

9 February, 21:00

Sheet B	1	2	3	4	5	6	7	8	Final
China 🔨	4	3	3	5	0	4	X	X	19
Saudi Arabia	0	0	0	0	1	0	X	X	1

Sheet C	1	2	3	4	5	6	7	8	Final
Japan 🔨	2	2	0	4	0	4	X	X	12
Qatar	0	0	1	0	1	0	X	X	2

Sheet E	1	2	3	4	5	6	7	8	Final
Thailand	0	0	0	0	0	1	X	X	1
Hong Kong 🔨	4	3	1	3	5	0	X	X	16

10 February, 14:00

Sheet C	1	2	3	4	5	6	7	8	Final
Thailand	0	1	0	0	0	1	0	X	2
Saudi Arabia 🔨	2	0	4	2	2	0	2	X	12

Sheet D	1	2	3	4	5	6	7	8	Final
Hong Kong	0	0	2	1	0	0	1	3	7
Japan 🔨	0	1	0	0	0	2	0	0	3

Sheet E	1	2	3	4	5	6	7	8	Final
Qatar	0	0	0	0	1	0	X	X	1
China 🔨	3	1	3	1	0	3	X	X	11

11 February, 14:00

Sheet B	1	2	3	4	5	6	7	8	Final
Hong Kong	3	1	2	1	0	3	X	X	10
Qatar 🔨	0	0	0	0	2	0	X	X	2

Sheet D	1	2	3	4	5	6	7	8	Final
China 🔨	5	2	3	1	5	0	X	X	16
Thailand	0	0	0	0	0	1	X	X	1

Sheet E	1	2	3	4	5	6	7	8	Final
Saudi Arabia	1	0	2	0	1	0	0	X	4
Japan 🔨	0	4	0	1	0	3	1	X	9

12 February, 9:00

Sheet A	1	2	3	4	5	6	7	8	Final
Saudi Arabia	0	0	0	0	0	1	X	X	1
Hong Kong 🔨	4	3	2	4	2	0	X	X	15

12 February, 14:00

Sheet A	1	2	3	4	5	6	7	8	Final
Qatar	1	1	0	1	0	0	1	2	6
Thailand 🔨	0	0	1	0	2	1	0	0	4

12 February, 19:00

Sheet A	1	2	3	4	5	6	7	8	Final
Japan 🔨	2	0	0	2	0	1	0	0	5
China	0	1	0	0	2	0	2	3	8

=== Knockout round ===
Qualification
A3	Kazakhstan	5
B2	Hong Kong	8
A2	Philippines	10
B3	Japan	4

Semifinals
A1	South Korea	13
B2	Hong Kong	2
B1	China	6
A2	Philippines	7

Gold medal game
A1	South Korea	3
A2	Philippines	5
Bronze medal game
B2	Hong Kong	3
B1	China	10

==== Qualification ====
13 February, 14:00

Sheet B	1	2	3	4	5	6	7	8	Final
Japan	1	0	2	0	1	0	0	X	4
Philippines 🔨	0	2	0	2	0	2	4	X	10

Sheet C	1	2	3	4	5	6	7	8	Final
Kazakhstan	1	0	1	0	3	0	0	0	5
Hong Kong 🔨	0	1	0	3	0	2	1	1	8

==== Semifinals ====
13 February, 19:00

Sheet D	1	2	3	4	5	6	7	8	Final
Hong Kong	0	0	1	0	1	0	X	X	2
South Korea 🔨	4	5	0	2	0	2	X	X	13

Sheet E	1	2	3	4	5	6	7	8	Final
Philippines	0	0	1	0	4	1	0	1	7
China 🔨	0	2	0	2	0	0	2	0	6

==== Bronze medal game ====
14 February, 9:00

Sheet C	1	2	3	4	5	6	7	8	Final
China 🔨	3	0	2	0	2	0	3	X	10
Hong Kong	0	1	0	1	0	1	0	X	3

==== Gold medal game ====
14 February, 9:00

Sheet B	1	2	3	4	5	6	7	8	Final
South Korea 🔨	0	0	1	0	1	1	0	0	3
Philippines	0	1	0	2	0	0	1	1	5

== Final standing ==
Rank	Team	Pld	W	L
1st place, gold medalist(s)	Philippines	7	6	1
2nd place, silver medalist(s)	South Korea	6	5	1
3rd place, bronze medalist(s)	China	7	6	1
4	Hong Kong	8	5	3
5	Japan	6	3	3
5	Kazakhstan	5	2	3
7	Chinese Taipei	4	1	3
8	Qatar	5	2	3
9	Kyrgyzstan	4	0	4
10	Saudi Arabia	5	1	4
11	Thailand	5	0	5
