= Ice hockey at the 2025 Asian Winter Games – Men's tournament =

Men at the 2025 Asian Winter Games
- Venue: Harbin Ice Hockey Arena; Harbin Sport University Stadium
- Date: 3–14 February 2025
- Competitors: 296 from 14 nations

Medalists
gold medal	Kazakhstan
silver medal	Japan
bronze medal	South Korea

The men's Ice hockey tournament at the 2025 Asian Winter Games was held in Harbin, China, between 3 and 14 February at the Harbin Ice Hockey Arena and Harbin Sport University Student Skating Hall.

The top 12 ranked NOC's in the IIHF World Ranking in May 2024 qualified for the men's tournament. but the United Arab Emirates withdrew later, the OCA changed the format and added India, Macau and Bahrain to make it a 14-team competition.

== Squads ==
Bahrain	China	Chinese Taipei	Hong Kong
Ammar Husain; Salman Sulaibeekh; Yousif Al-Salah; Rashed Al-Mutlaq; Abdulla Sayer; Sameh Hegazi; Abdulrahman Turki; Majeed Ali; Ahmed Masaud; Abdullatif Hejres; Mohamed Salah Al-Atwi; Salman Al-Thawadi; Abdulla Janahi; Abdulla Al-Marzooqi; Rashed Al-Bahri; Abdulla Turki; Abdulla Al-Adhab; Abdulla Al-Mutawa	Xu Lang; Chen Zimeng; Zong Hanming; Zuo Tianyou; Zhang Pengfei; Yu Jilong; Zhang Jiaqi; Guo Jianing; Li Zhihao; Chen Kailin; Liu Zihao; Chen Shifeng; Sun Zehao; Han Yuhang; Zhang Zesen; Zheng Mingju; Fu Rao; Yu Haoran; Yan Juncheng; Wang Jing; Hou Yuyang; Li Mingshenhao; Zhuang Xinyu	Lee Yi-cheng; Chen Tai-yu; Sang Chuo-en; Chen Chiung-yuan; Lin Yi-kuan; Chang Han-yuan; Shih Chen-yun; Lin Hung-ju; Lin Ching; Li Zheng-wei; Lin Yo-chen; Lin Jui-yu; Pan Yi-cheng; Yang Chang-hsing; Wang Po-hsiang; Wang Yung-hsuan; Peng Mo; Chen Kuan-ting; Wen Pei-an; Yu Sung-yin	David Lam; Tony Leung; To Hei Yu; Chan Ho Pong; Maxwell Tong; Wang Tsan Lam; Ryan Lee; Yannick Wong; Ryan Chu; Bryan Tang; Wong Ka Ho; Yam Yau; Howard Yuen; Justin Cheng; Michael Gan; Yam Yi; Jasper Tang; Ngan Cheuk Long; Randy Mak; Cheung Ching Ho; Alvin Sham; Colby Elmer; Michael Shum
India	Japan	Kazakhstan	Kuwait
Tsewang Gyaltson; Sajjad Hussain; Stanzin Lotus; Tsering Angchuk; Ghulam Mustafa; Stanzin Angchok; Rigzin Norboo; Stanzin Namgyal; Stanzin Phandey; Angchok Lakdan; Namgail Tundup; Mohd Ismail; Mohammad Ali Baba; Namgail Tashi; Angchok Dorjay; Chamba Tsetan; Jigmath Kunzang; Lotus Chamba; Namgyal Deldan; Tsewang Dorjay; Nawang Zangpo; Namgyal Deskyong; Tsering Angdus	Yuta Narisawa; Seiya Hayata; Koki Yoneyama; Jiei Halliday; Kotaro Yamada; Kotaro Tsutsumi; Riku Ishida; Kenta Takagi; Toi Kobayashi; Kosuke Otsu; Hiroto Sato; Masato Okubo; Yuto Osawa; Taiga Irikura; Shigeki Hitosato; Makuru Furuhashi; Shogo Nakajima; Yusei Otsu; Kento Suzuki; Sota Isogai; Kazuki Lawlor; Issa Otsuka; Eiki Sato	Jelaladdin Amirbekov; Dmitriy Breus; Tamirlan Gaitamirov; Andrey Buyalskiy; Samat Daniyar; Ruslan Ospanov; Danil Butenko; Alikhan Omirbekov; Artyom Korolyov; Alexandr Borissevich; Roman Starchenko; Yevgeniy Rymarev; Dmitriy Grents; Andrey Shutov; Vyacheslav Kolesnikov; Kirill Panyukov; Denis Chaporov; Kirill Savitskiy; Ivan Stepanenko; Eduard Mikhailov; Artyom Likhotnikov; Adil Beketayev; Maxim Pavlenko	Zaid Al-Saied; Mohammad Al-Maragi; Khalaf Al-Khalaf; Abdulrazaq Al-Daei; Mashari Al-Ajmi; Mohammad Al-Duaij; Abdullah Al-Maragi; Salem Al-Mari; Jasem Al-Awadhi; Bojan Zidarević; Kamil Vavra; Valery Budzevich; Meshal Al-Foudari; Abdullah Al-Asousi; Adam Barvík; Abdulaziz Al-Khashan; Abdulmohsen Al-Khashram; Ilia Drozdetskikh; Abdulaziz Al-Maragi; Anton Tsibin
Kyrgyzstan	Macau	Singapore	South Korea
Artem Vasilev; Egor Leshchenko; Adis Kachkynbekov; Adilet Nuraliev; Aleksandr Titov; Maksim Egorov; Ernazar Isamatov; Belek Maksatbekov; Adil Bekmuratov; Ersultan Mirbekov; Islambek Abdyraev; Kuzma Terentyev; Anton Kudashev; Zakhar Bem; Sultan Ismanov; Arslan Maraimbekov; Mamed Seifulov; Denis Popov; Tair Supokhunov	Katsuyoshi Shinoda; Un Kin Fai; Guan Chentao; Edison Sou; Lao Chon Hou; Chon Ka Miu; Kong Chong Man; Herminio Cheng; Lin Zhi Hang; Leung Manlong; Hu Zhaoting Tse; Lao Chi Chong; Ho Hou; Yeung Ho Yin; Leong Chon Kong; Wong Kit Cheng; Lei Pak In; Ku Hio Tong; Ieong Weng Hei; Li Chon Hei; Argus Hong	Joshua Lee; Richard O'Brien; Ryan Wintland; Benedict Qian; James Kodrowski; Noah Blakney; Ian Wong; Gabriel Lim; Lee Chin Hao; Lee Shaw Hsiang; Ryan Goh; Kok Hung Wei; Ryan Tan; Bryan Lee; Cael Chua; Chew Wee; Brandon Russell Gunawardena; Joshua Chan	Lee Seung-jae; Kim Won-jun; Oh In-gyo; Kim Sang-yeob; Kim Si-hwan; Kong Yu-chan; Kim Sang-wook; Lee Min-jae; Kim Dong-hwan; Ahn Jin-hui; Ha Jung-ho; Lee Yeon-seung; Jeon Jung-woo; Nam Hee-doo; Lim Dong-kyu; Kwon Hyeon-su; Kim Geon-woo; Lee Chong-min; Lee Hyun-seung; Lee Moo-young; Kang Min-wan; Kang Yoon-seok
Thailand	Turkmenistan		
Ben Kleineschay; Rakchai Sukwiboon; Ken Kindborn; Nakrit Sutivijitho; Pann Hongswadhi; Punn Phasukkijwatana; Athit Khunraj; Patrick Forstner; Sarawut Watthana; Nick Lampson; Sarawut Phasookwong; Thanachai Sakchaicharoenkul; Araya Vatanapanyakul; Nathaphat Luckanatinakorn; Chanokchon Limpinphet; Thatsanai Phuangrot; Dominik Vollenweider; Natchayatorn Yannakornthanapunt; Satira Tawon; James McAlear; Kim Aarola; Jan Isaksson	Taňryberdi Guwanjow; Gurbanmyrat Taňňyýew; Serdar Durdyýew; Maksat Kakaýew; Döwlet Hydyrow; Amangeldi Aganyýazow; Baýmyrat Baýmyradow; Arslan Geldimyradow; Arslan Nuryýew; Ahmet Gurbanow; Serdar Kakajanow; Döwrangeldi Baýjaýew; Öwezguly Esenow; Begenç Döwletmyradow; Nowruz Baýhanow; Aleksandr Wahowskiý; Keremli Çaryýew; Nazar Orazow; Erkin Kakabaýew; Musa Annasaparow; Allan Muhyýew		

== Results ==
All times are China Standard Time (UTC+08:00)

=== Preliminary round ===
==== Group A ====
Pos	Team	Pld	W	OW	OL	L	GF	GA	GD	Pts	Qualification
1	Kazakhstan	5	5	0	0	0	41	3	+38	15	Quarterfinals
2	South Korea	5	3	1	0	1	36	10	+26	11	Quarterfinals
3	Japan	5	3	0	0	2	28	11	+17	9	Quarterfinals
4	China	5	2	0	1	2	20	14	+6	7	Quarterfinals
5	Chinese Taipei	5	1	0	0	4	4	52	−48	3	Quarterfinals
6	Thailand	5	0	0	0	5	2	41	−39	0	Quarterfinals

Source: OCA

4 February; 12:00	Chinese Taipei	0–15 (0–4, 0–8, 0–3)	Japan	Harbin Ice Hockey Arena, Harbin; Attendance: 2,913

Game reference

Lee Yi-cheng
Goalies
Eiki Sato
Referees:
Chae Young-jin (KOR)
Timur Morev (KAZ)

0–1	06:19 – Hitosato (K. Otsu)
0–2	08:12 – Suzuki (Irikura, Y. Otsu)
0–3	19:30 – Yoneyama (K. Otsu, Osawa)
0–4	19:53 – Hitosato
0–5	22:43 – Halliday (Hitosato, K. Otsu)
0–6	24:23 – Isogai (Y. Otsu, Irikura)
0–7	26:59 – Suzuki (Y. Otsu, Irikura)
0–8	27:37 – Isogai (Y. Otsu)
0–9	29:01 – K. Otsu (Yoneyama, Hitosato)
0–10	31:37 – Lawlor (Tsutsumi, Yoneyama)
0–11	31:57 – Furuhashi (Kobayashi)
0–12	37:08 – Yoneyama (Hitosato, Kobayashi) (PP)
0–13	50:59 – Okubo (Hitosato, Kobayashi)
0–14	55:19 – Suzuki (Isogai, Irikura)
0–15	57:26 – Irikura (Suzuki, H. Sato) (PP2)

10 min
Penalties
6 min
13
Shots
61

4 February; 16:00	Thailand	0–12 (0–4, 0–2, 0–6)	Kazakhstan	Harbin Ice Hockey Arena, Harbin; Attendance: 1,634

Game reference

Ben Kleineschay
Goalies
Andrey Shutov
Referees:
Kang Tae-woo (KOR)
Liu Jiaqi (CHN)

0–1	10:58 – Kolesnikov (Buyalskiy, Likhotnikov)
0–2	11:33 – Starchenko (Rymarev, Omirbekov)
0–3	13:04 – Ospanov (Korolyov)
0–4	13:25 – Stepanenko (Kolesnikov, Likhotnikov)
0–5	33:12 – Omirbekov (Beketayev, Daniyar)
0–6	36:04 – Beketayev (Daniyar, Starchenko)
0–7	40:27 – Rymarev (Panyukov, Omirbekov) (PP)
0–8	44:53 – Buyalskiy (Stepanenko, Likhotnikov)
0–9	46:51 – Likhotnikov (Savitskiy, Beketayev) (SH)
0–10	49:25 – Beketayev (Starchenko, Daniyar)
0–11	54:31 – Gaitamirov (Panyukov, Breus)
0–12	59:15 – Likhotnikov (Stepanenko, Buyalskiy)

4 min
Penalties
2 min
4
Shots
66

4 February; 20:00	China	5–6 OT (2–1, 2–2, 1–2) (OT: 0–1)	South Korea	Harbin Ice Hockey Arena, Harbin; Attendance: 2,916

Game reference

Chen Shifeng
Goalies
Lee Yeon-seung
Referees:
Anton Boryayev (KAZ)
Konstantin Chubenko (KAZ)

	0–1	06:32 – Lee C. (Kim S.W., Nam)
Zhang J. (Guo, Zhang P.) – 09:15	1–1
Yan (Zhang J., Zhang Z.) – 17:36	2–1
Zheng (Wang, Chen Z.) – 24:13	3–1
Guo (Zhang Z., Zhang P.) – 24:43	4–1
	4–2	34:31 – Ahn (Lee C., Kim S.W.)
	4–3	36:17 – Kim S.Y. (Kim S.H., Kim W.)
	4–4	47:53 – Kim S.Y. (Kong, Kim S.W.) (PP)
Yu J. – 52:50	5–4
	5–5	55:00 – Lee C. (Kang Y., Nam) (PP)
	5–6	64:15 – Kim S.W. (Nam, Lee C.)

12 min
Penalties
4 min
14
Shots
47

5 February; 12:00	Japan	8–1 (1–0, 4–0, 3–1)	Thailand	Harbin Ice Hockey Arena, Harbin; Attendance: 715

Game reference

Issa Otsuka
Goalies
Dominik Vollenweider
Referees:
Shen Yen-chin (TPE)
Wang Gongbo (CHN)

Isogai (Lawlor, Irikura) – 09:21	1–0
Yoneyama (Hitosato, Isogai) (PP) – 25:29	2–0
Yamada (Osawa, Lawlor) (SH) – 27:00	3–0
Furuhashi (Kobayashi) – 39:05	4–0
Takagi (Halliday, H. Sato) – 39:43	5–0
Yamada (Isogai, Irikura) – 44:17	6–0
Suzuki (Isogai, H. Sato) – 50:06	7–0
	7–1	54:15 – Aarola (PP)
Okubo (K. Otsu, Halliday) – 54:33	8–1

8 min
Penalties
6 min
76
Shots
13

5 February; 16:00	South Korea	14–1 (4–0, 6–0, 4–1)	Chinese Taipei	Harbin Ice Hockey Arena, Harbin; Attendance: 1,597

Game reference

Ha Jung-ho
Goalies
Lee Yi-cheng
Referees:
Liu Jiaqi (CHN)
Faris Hakimin Yusoff (MAS)

Kong (Kim S.H.) – 05:41	1–0
Kim S.W. (Ahn, Lee C.) – 11:14	2–0
Oh (Kong, Kim G.) – 11:38	3–0
Kim S.Y. (Kong, Kim W.) – 17:19	4–0
Kim S.W. (Lee C., Nam) – 20:09	5–0
Kim S.Y. (Kang M., Kim W.) – 23:20	6–0
Ahn (Kim S.W., Lee M.J.) – 24:40	7–0
Oh (Lee C., Kim S.W.) – 32:28	8–0
Lee C. (Kim S.W., Ahn) – 37:25	9–0
Ahn (Lee C., Kim S.W.) – 37:45	10–0
Nam (Ahn, Kim S.W.) – 40:22	11–0
	11–1	40:58 – Peng (Wen)
Lee C. (Kim S.W., Ahn) – 49:42	12–1
Kim S.W. (Lee C., Kong) – 53:41	13–1
Kwon (Kim S.Y., Oh) – 57:32	14–1

2 min
Penalties
6 min
65
Shots
7

5 February; 20:00	Kazakhstan	6–1 (3–0, 1–0, 2–1)	China	Harbin Ice Hockey Arena, Harbin; Attendance: 3,046

Game reference

Andrey Shutov
Goalies
Sun Zehao
Referees:
Chae Young-jin (KOR)
Kang Tae-woo (KOR)

Breus (Savitskiy, Panyukov) – 00:42	1–0
Grents (Daniyar, Savitskiy) (PP) – 02:59	2–0
Starchenko (Rymarev, Daniyar) – 07:47	3–0
Rymarev (Mikhailov) – 24:42	4–0
Kolesnikov (Buyalskiy, Breus) – 45:02	5–0
Kolesnikov (Borissevich, Chaporov) – 48:53	6–0
	6–1	55:18 – Zhang P. (Zheng, Wang) (PP2)

8 min
Penalties
6 min
44
Shots
9

7 February; 9:00	Kazakhstan	17–0 (5–0, 5–0, 7–0)	Chinese Taipei	Harbin Ice Hockey Arena, Harbin; Attendance: 1,748

Game reference

Jelaladdin Amirbekov
Maxim Pavlenko
Goalies
Chen Tai-yu
Lee Yi-cheng
Referees:
Chae Young-jin (KOR)
Wang Gongbo (CHN)

Buyalskiy (Mikhailov, Stepanenko) – 01:44	1–0
Likhotnikov (Panyukov, Savitskiy) – 06:25	2–0
Rymarev (Omirbekov, Starchenko) – 08:44	3–0
Panyukov (Likhotnikov, Savitskiy) – 09:02	4–0
Panyukov (Savitskiy, Likhotnikov) – 11:34	5–0
Omirbekov (Rymarev, Daniyar) – 20:28	6–0
Korolyov (Butenko, Chaporov) – 22:40	7–0
Savitskiy (Panyukov) – 27:57	8–0
Panyukov (Starchenko, Beketayev) (PP) – 32:36	9–0
Omirbekov (Beketayev, Starchenko) – 35:26	10–0
Daniyar (Rymarev, Omirbekov) – 47:44	11–0
Grents (Likhotnikov, Daniyar) (PP) – 49:44	12–0
Ospanov (Chaporov, Borissevich) – 50:58	13–0
Panyukov (Butenko, Likhotnikov) – 53:43	14–0
Ospanov (Borissevich, Chaporov) – 54:05	15–0
Borissevich (Gaitamirov, Likhotnikov) – 56:43	16–0
Chaporov (Borissevich, Breus) – 58:14	17–0

0 min
Penalties
6 min
76
Shots
9

7 February; 12:30	Thailand	0–8 (0–3, 0–3, 0–2)	China	Harbin Ice Hockey Arena, Harbin; Attendance: 3,060

Game reference

Ben Kleineschay
Goalies
Chen Shifeng
Referees:
Kang Tae-woo (KOR)
Timur Morev (KAZ)

0–1	06:50 – Yan (Guo, Zhang Z.)
0–2	09:52 – Yu J. (Li M., Zuo)
0–3	14:50 – Yan (Hou) (SH)
0–4	28:06 – Zhang P. (Hou, Wang) (PP)
0–5	29:44 – Zhang Z. (Guo, Zhang P.)
0–6	30:41 – Wang (Hou, Zheng)
0–7	52:07 – Wang
0–8	56:51 – Yan (Zhang P., Zhang Z.)

10 min
Penalties
10 min
17
Shots
49

7 February; 12:30	South Korea	5–2 (1–1, 3–1, 1–0)	Japan	Harbin Sport University Stadium, Harbin; Attendance: 1,044

Game reference

Lee Yeon-seung
Goalies
Yuta Narisawa
Referees:
Konstantin Chubenko (KAZ)
Liu Jiaqi (CHN)

	0–1	02:25 – Okubo (Kobayashi, H. Sato) (PP)
Lee C. (Ahn, Kim S.W.) – 06:06	1–1
Kim S.W. (Ahn, Lee C.) – 20:27	2–1
	2–2	21:57 – Irikura (Suzuki, Isogai)
Kim S.Y. (Lee H., Lee S.) – 27:24	3–2
Kim S.W. (Lee S., Lee C.) – 36:41	4–2
Kang Y. (Oh, Lee C.) – 58:32	5–2

6 min
Penalties
4 min
29
Shots
31

8 February; 12:00	Japan	1–4 (1–1, 0–2, 0–1)	Kazakhstan	Harbin Ice Hockey Arena, Harbin; Attendance: 2,709

Game reference

Yuta Narisawa
Goalies
Andrey Shutov
Referees:
Chae Young-jin (KOR)
Wang Gongbo (CHN)

Okubo (Y. Otsu, Tsutsumi) – 01:28	1–0
	1–1	15:00 – Borissevich (Ospanov, Buyalskiy)
	1–2	31:58 – Beketayev (Savitskiy, Kolesnikov) (PP)
	1–3	35:15 – Rymarev (Beketayev, Starchenko) (PP)
	1–4	45:19 – Starchenko (Rymarev, Omirbekov)

8 min
Penalties
2 min
19
Shots
23

8 February; 16:00	Thailand	0–10 (0–5, 0–1, 0–4)	South Korea	Harbin Ice Hockey Arena, Harbin; Attendance: 1,821

Game reference

Dominik Vollenweider
Goalies
Ha Jung-ho
Referees:
Li Ho Ching (HKG)
Shen Yen-chin (TPE)

0–1	03:25 – Kim S.Y. (Lim, Lee M.J.)
0–2	05:57 – Kim S.W. (Lee C., Lim)
0–3	08:56 – Jeon (Kwon, Nam)
0–4	12:02 – Lee H. (Lee M.J., Kang Y.)
0–5	16:43 – Kang M. (Kim S.Y., Kim S.H.)
0–6	35:51 – Lee C. (Kim S.W., Ahn)
0–7	42:45 – Kim S.W. (Kim W., Lee C.)
0–8	52:49 – Kim S.Y. (Kong, Kang M.)
0–9	55:01 – Ahn (Kim S.W., Oh)
0–10	57:10 – Lee C. (Nam, Kim S.W.) (PP)

4 min
Penalties
0 min
5
Shots
84

8 February; 20:00	China	5–0 (4–0, 0–0, 1–0)	Chinese Taipei	Harbin Ice Hockey Arena, Harbin; Attendance: 3,101

Game reference

Sun Zehao
Goalies
Chen Tai-yu
Lee Yi-cheng
Referees:
Anton Boryayev (KAZ)
Konstantin Chubenko (KAZ)

Hou (Han) – 00:56	1–0
Yu J. (Yan, Zuo) (PP) – 03:32	2–0
Zhang Z. (SH) – 06:12	3–0
Yan (Han, Zhang Z.) (PP) – 14:14	4–0
Wang (Zhang P., Hou) (PP) – 50:15	5–0

8 min
Penalties
10 min
51
Shots
14

10 February; 12:00	Kazakhstan	2–1 (0–1, 0–0, 2–0)	South Korea	Harbin Ice Hockey Arena, Harbin; Attendance: 2,079

Game reference

Andrey Shutov
Goalies
Lee Yeon-seung
Referees:
Liu Jiaqi (CHN)
Shen Yen-chin (TPE)

	0–1	11:08 – Kang Y. (Nam, Lee C.) (PP)
Likhotnikov (Savitskiy, Daniyar) (PP) – 44:58	1–1
Starchenko (Rymarev, Panyukov) (PP) – 58:42	2–1

4 min
Penalties
10 min
32
Shots
26

10 February; 16:00	Chinese Taipei	3–1 (0–0, 2–0, 1–1)	Thailand	Harbin Ice Hockey Arena, Harbin; Attendance: 2,089

Game reference

Lee Yi-cheng
Goalies
Dominik Vollenweider
Referees:
Wang Gongbo (CHN)
Faris Hakimin Yusoff (MAS)

Chang (Lin H., Lin J.) – 22:42	1–0
Wen (Lin Y.C., Peng) – 30:09	2–0
Lin Y.C. (SH) – 44:36	3–0
	3–1	53:15 – Aarola (Kindborn, Yannakornthanapunt) (PP)

16 min
Penalties
8 min
41
Shots
36

10 February; 20:00	Japan	2–1 (0–1, 1–0, 1–0)	China	Harbin Ice Hockey Arena, Harbin; Attendance: 3,288

Game reference

Yuta Narisawa
Goalies
Chen Shifeng
Referees:
Konstantin Chubenko (KAZ)
Timur Morev (KAZ)

	0–1	01:36 – Hou (Han)
Ishida (H. Sato, Kobayashi) (PP) – 34:09	1–1
Takagi (Ishida) – 51:30	2–1

10 min
Penalties
10 min
37
Shots
21

==== Group B ====
Pos	Team	Pld	W	OW	OL	L	GF	GA	GD	Pts	Qualification
1	Kyrgyzstan	3	2	1	0	0	49	10	+39	8	Quarterfinals
2	Kuwait	3	2	0	1	0	52	12	+40	7	Placement 9–10
3	Singapore	3	1	0	0	2	25	22	+3	3	Placement 11–12
4	Bahrain	3	0	0	0	3	1	83	−82	0	Placement 13–14

Source: OCA

3 February; 9:00	Kuwait	8–9 OT (5–3, 2–2, 1–3) (OT: 0–1)	Kyrgyzstan	Harbin Ice Hockey Arena, Harbin; Attendance: 1,837

Game reference

Adam Barvík
Goalies
Arslan Maraimbekov
Artem Vasilev
Referee:
Shen Yen-chin (TPE)

Tsibin (Drozdetskikh) – 03:57	1–0
	1–1	04:11 – Egorov (Abdyraev)
	1–2	04:42 – Bekmuratov (Ismanov, Mirbekov)
	1–3	06:44 – Seifulov (Bem, Nuraliev)
Al-Mari (Drozdetskikh, Budzevich) – 07:32	2–3
Drozdetskikh (Tsibin, Budzevich) – 08:20	3–3
Drozdetskikh (Tsibin, Budzevich) – 10:22	4–3
Tsibin (Drozdetskikh) – 19:26	5–3
Drozdetskikh – 28:37	6–3
Tsibin (Drozdetskikh, Budzevich) – 30:13	7–3
	7–4	35:50 – Seifulov (Titov, Popov) (PP)
	7–5	36:31 – Mirbekov (Bekmuratov, Kachkynbekov)
	7–6	42:07 – Abdyraev (Titov, Seifulov)
	7–7	43:10 – Seifulov (Mirbekov)
Drozdetskikh (Tsibin, Budzevich) – 44:03	8–7
	8–8	59:26 – Seifulov (Terentyev, Abdyraev)
	8–9	60:19 – Seifulov (Abdyraev)

12 min
Penalties
8 min
21
Shots
64

3 February; 13:00	Singapore	20–1 (12–0, 5–0, 3–1)	Bahrain	Harbin Ice Hockey Arena, Harbin; Attendance: 2,517

Game reference

Joshua Lee
Lee Chin Hao
Goalies
Abdulla Al-Adhab
Referee:
Faris Hakimin Yusoff (MAS)

B. Lee (Kodrowski, Chua) – 00:50	1–0
Chan (Blakney) – 01:14	2–0
Chew (Kodrowski, Chua) – 05:09	3–0
Blakney (Goh, O'Brien) – 07:38	4–0
B. Lee (O'Brien) – 09:03	5–0
Chan (SH) – 09:41	6–0
Qian (Chan, Tan) (PP) – 12:16	7–0
Lim (Wintland) – 12:57	8–0
Gunawardena (Kok) – 13:23	9–0
Chan (O'Brien, Kodrowski) – 14:17	10–0
Wintland (Lee S., Tan) – 16:22	11–0
Lee S. (Wintland) – 16:57	12–0
Lee S. (Wintland, Chew) – 27:27	13–0
Goh (Chew) (SH) – 29:40	14–0
Gunawardena (B. Lee, Kodrowski) – 32:04	15–0
Kok (Lim, Chua) – 32:29	16–0
Chan (Blakney) – 37:02	17–0
Gunawardena (Goh, Chan) – 43:05	18–0
Lim (Lee S.) – 50:38	19–0
	19–1	53:02 – Al-Bahri
Chua (Lim, Chew) – 55:08	20–1

8 min
Penalties
6 min
59
Shots
8

5 February; 9:00	Singapore	3–10 (0–3, 0–4, 3–3)	Kuwait	Harbin Sport University Stadium, Harbin; Attendance: 383

Game reference

Joshua Lee
Goalies
Adam Barvík
Zaid Al-Saied
Referee:
Timur Morev (KAZ)

	0–1	09:26 – Vavra (Al-Awadhi, Zidarević)
	0–2	10:12 – Tsibin (Al-Khashan, Al-Khalaf)
	0–3	15:43 – Drozdetskikh (Budzevich, Al-Khalaf)
	0–4	20:51 – Tsibin (Budzevich)
	0–5	24:55 – Drozdetskikh (Budzevich, Al-Khalaf)
	0–6	25:49 – Tsibin (Vavra, Al-Awadhi) (PP)
	0–7	36:10 – Al-Awadhi (Vavra)
Chan – 41:24	1–7
	1–8	48:50 – Zidarević (Vavra)
	1–9	52:06 – Drozdetskikh (Al-Awadhi, Al-Daei) (PP)
Kodrowski (Chan) – 53:20	2–9
	2–10	54:40 – Budzevich (Drozdetskikh, Al-Mari)
Chan (Kodrowski, Chew) (PP) – 56:30	3–10

10 min
Penalties
10 min
28
Shots
47

5 February; 13:00	Kyrgyzstan	29–0 (10–0, 10–0, 9–0)	Bahrain	Harbin Sport University Stadium, Harbin; Attendance: 398

Game reference

Artem Vasilev
Goalies
Abdulla Al-Adhab
Rashed Al-Mutlaq
Referee:
Anton Boryayev (KAZ)

Bekmuratov (Mirbekov, Popov) (PP) – 04:03	1–0
Leshchenko (Supokhunov, Nuraliev) – 09:11	2–0
Titov (Egorov, Seifulov) – 09:56	3–0
Mirbekov (Popov, Bekmuratov) – 11:02	4–0
Abdyraev (Titov, Nuraliev) – 12:46	5–0
Mirbekov – 15:17	6–0
Supokhunov – 16:27	7–0
Titov (Abdyraev, Terentyev) – 16:40	8–0
Ismanov (Bekmuratov) – 18:37	9–0
Abdyraev (Titov, Egorov) – 19:25	10–0
Egorov (Abdyraev, Seifulov) – 20:25	11–0
Nuraliev (Bem, Leshchenko) – 25:34	12–0
Seifulov (Titov, Egorov) – 25:54	13–0
Titov (Seifulov, Abdyraev) – 29:28	14–0
Titov (Abdyraev, Seifulov) – 30:10	15–0
Ismanov – 33:42	16–0
Popov (Mirbekov) – 33:55	17–0
Maksatbekov (Supokhunov, Nuraliev) – 34:25	18–0
Egorov (Seifulov, Titov) – 36:38	19–0
Popov (Ismanov, Mirbekov) (SH) – 39:41	20–0
Mirbekov (Kachkynbekov, Popov) (SH) – 40:38	21–0
Kachkynbekov (Ismanov) – 44:37	22–0
Bem (Nuraliev, Supokhunov) – 46:02	23–0
Seifulov (Abdyraev) – 46:58	24–0
Popov (Ismanov, Mirbekov) – 50:44	25–0
Ismanov (Mirbekov, Bekmuratov) – 50:54	26–0
Popov (Mirbekov, Ismanov) – 53:41	27–0
Kachkynbekov (Mirbekov, Bekmuratov) – 54:34	28–0
Seifulov – 57:00	29–0

7 min
Penalties
2 min
102
Shots
3

9 February; 17:00	Kyrgyzstan	11–2 (3–1, 6–0, 2–1)	Singapore	Harbin Ice Hockey Arena, Harbin; Attendance: 2,765

Game reference

Artem Vasilev
Arslan Maraimbekov
Goalies
Joshua Lee
Referee:
Shen Yen-chin (TPE)

Seifulov (Abdyraev, Terentyev) – 02:25	1–0
Ismanov (Bekmuratov, Isamatov) – 12:53	2–0
	2–1	13:08 – Blakney (Kodrowski)
Abdyraev (Egorov, Seifulov) – 19:37	3–1
Seifulov (Leshchenko, Terentyev) – 20:56	4–1
Abdyraev (Titov, Seifulov) (PP) – 22:34	5–1
Ismanov (Mirbekov) – 24:51	6–1
Popov (Mirbekov, Ismanov) – 25:18	7–1
Titov (Seifulov, Terentyev) – 30:11	8–1
Seifulov (Terentyev, Abdyraev) (PP) – 34:42	9–1
Maksatbekov (Supokhunov, Nuraliev) – 46:12	10–1
Mirbekov (Bekmuratov, Ismanov) – 47:22	11–1
	11–2	51:04 – Chan (Goh)

2 min
Penalties
8 min
89
Shots
9

9 February; 21:00	Bahrain	0–34 (0–10, 0–10, 0–14)	Kuwait	Harbin Ice Hockey Arena, Harbin; Attendance: 907

Game reference

Rashed Al-Mutlaq
Abdulla Al-Adhab
Goalies
Adam Barvík
Zaid Al-Saied
Referee:
Li Ho Ching (HKG)

0–1	01:38 – Al-Khashan (Al-Ajmi, Al-Foudari)
0–2	03:52 – Drozdetskikh (Tsibin)
0–3	04:20 – Tsibin (Budzevich, Drozdetskikh)
0–4	06:18 – Al-Khalaf (Al-Khashan, Al-Foudari)
0–5	08:26 – Vavra (Al-Awadhi, Abdula. Al-Maragi)
0–6	10:32 – Tsibin (Al-Foudari)
0–7	13:35 – Al-Mari (Al-Khalaf, Tsibin) (PP)
0–8	14:05 – Vavra (Zidarević)
0–9	17:00 – Abdull. Al-Maragi (Vavra, Al-Duaij)
0–10	17:56 – Drozdetskikh (Tsibin, Budzevich)
0–11	21:37 – Vavra (Al-Daei)
0–12	21:56 – Al-Khashan (Al-Khashram)
0–13	26:21 – Zidarević (Vavra, Al-Awadhi)
0–14	28:36 – Al-Khashram (Tsibin) (SH)
0–15	29:46 – Tsibin (Budzevich)
0–16	30:05 – Budzevich (Drozdetskikh)
0–17	35:05 – Drozdetskikh
0–18	35:56 – Vavra (Al-Awadhi, Zidarević)
0–19	36:56 – Al-Ajmi (Al-Khashram, Al-Foudari)
0–20	39:06 – Drozdetskikh (Budzevich, Al-Khalaf)
0–21	40:35 – Budzevich (Drozdetskikh, Tsibin)
0–22	41:13 – Al-Daei (Vavra, Al-Awadhi) (PP)
0–23	42:15 – Tsibin
0–24	45:31 – Tsibin (Budzevich, Drozdetskikh)
0–25	46:19 – Vavra (Zidarević, Al-Awadhi)
0–26	50:00 – Budzevich (Tsibin, Drozdetskikh)
0–27	50:24 – Zidarević (Vavra, Al-Awadhi)
0–28	55:36 – Tsibin (Budzevich) (SH)
0–29	56:24 – Zidarević (Vavra)
0–30	57:57 – Al-Asousi (Vavra, Abdull. Al-Maragi)
0–31	58:29 – Tsibin (Budzevich, Drozdetskikh)
0–32	58:48 – Al-Mari (Tsibin, Drozdetskikh)
0–33	59:23 – Vavra (Al-Awadhi)
0–34	59:33 – Al-Awadhi (Vavra)

8 min
Penalties
6 min
9
Shots
86

==== Group C ====
Pos	Team	Pld	W	OW	OL	L	GF	GA	GD	Pts	Qualification
1	Hong Kong	3	3	0	0	0	61	2	+59	9	Quarterfinals
2	Turkmenistan	3	2	0	0	1	46	6	+40	6	Placement 9–10
3	India	3	1	0	0	2	5	51	−46	3	Placement 11–12
4	Macau	3	0	0	0	3	3	56	−53	0	Placement 13–14

Source: OCA

3 February; 21:00	Hong Kong	26–1 (12–0, 6–0, 8–1)	Macau	Harbin Ice Hockey Arena, Harbin; Attendance: 1,608

Game reference

Cheung Ching Ho
David Lam
Goalies
Leung Manlong
Referee:
Wang Gongbo (CHN)

Tong (B. Tang) – 01:18	1–0
Wang (SH) – 03:07	2–0
Chu (Yam Ya.) (SH) – 03:58	3–0
Lee (Sham) – 05:28	4–0
B. Tang (J. Tang, Y. Wong) – 05:58	5–0
Chan (Leung, Wang) – 06:40	6–0
Tong (B. Tang) – 08:21	7–0
J. Tang (Ngan, Yam Ya.) – 09:43	8–0
Wang (To, Sham) – 10:04	9–0
Tong (Yam Ya.) – 12:46	10–0
Tong (Lee, To) (PP) – 16:56	11–0
B. Tang (Elmer, Cheng) – 19:25	12–0
B. Tang (Lee, Tong) – 22:37	13–0
Mak (Cheng, Leung) – 25:49	14–0
Lee (Chu, Wong K.) – 28:43	15–0
J. Tang – 30:09	16–0
Tong (Chu, Yam Ya.) – 34:18	17–0
B. Tang (Tong, Chu) – 39:14	18–0
B. Tang (Tong, Yuen) – 45:01	19–0
Tong (Chu, B. Tang) – 45:39	20–0
Cheng (Elmer) – 46:31	21–0
Wong K. – 47:14	22–0
Chu (Tong) – 50:37	23–0
	23–1	55:20 – Hong (SH)
Elmer (B. Tang) (SH) – 56:33	24–1
Wang (B. Tang, Chan) (SH) – 57:47	25–1
Tong (Mak, B. Tang) – 59:50	26–1

10 min
Penalties
10 min
111
Shots
4

5 February; 17:00	Hong Kong	30–0 (10–0, 12–0, 8–0)	India	Harbin Sport University Stadium, Harbin; Attendance: 569

Game reference

Cheung Ching Ho
Michael Gan
Goalies
Lotus Chamba
Namgail Tundup
Referee:
Konstantin Chubenko (KAZ)

B. Tang – 00:51	1–0
Elmer (Cheng) – 01:23	2–0
Chu – 05:44	3–0
Mak (J. Tang, Tong) – 08:05	4–0
B. Tang (Lee, Mak) – 09:22	5–0
Chu (B. Tang, Shum) – 10:21	6–0
Chu (B. Tang, Shum) – 18:28	7–0
Shum (Lee, Mak) – 19:06	8–0
Yam Ya. (Cheng) – 19:33	9–0
Elmer (Cheng, Yam Ya.) – 19:44	10–0
Tong (J. Tang, Ngan) – 20:52	11–0
Cheng (Y. Wong) (SH) – 23:25	12–0
Lee (Chu) – 26:23	13–0
Lee (J. Tang, Tong) (PP) – 29:50	14–0
Chu (Mak, B. Tang) – 30:17	15–0
B. Tang – 30:37	16–0
Tong (J. Tang, Leung) – 32:53	17–0
Y. Wong (Chu) – 34:04	18–0
Ngan (Yam Ya., Chan) – 36:39	19–0
Chu (J. Tang, Yuen) – 37:46	20–0
Wang (Cheng) – 38:21	21–0
Yam Ya. (Chu) (PP) – 39:57	22–0
Ngan (Shum, B. Tang) (PP) – 41:48	23–0
Chu (Yam Ya., To) – 42:02	24–0
Tong (J. Tang, Cheng) – 43:18	25–0
J. Tang (Cheng) – 43:46	26–0
Mak (Sham, Lee) (PP) – 49:40	27–0
B. Tang – 49:50	28–0
B. Tang (Chu) – 56:25	29–0
Tong (B. Tang, Wong K.) – 58:58	30–0

10 min
Penalties
12 min
85
Shots
1

5 February; 21:00	Turkmenistan	26–0 (6–0, 5–0, 15–0)	Macau	Harbin Sport University Stadium, Harbin; Attendance: 393

Game reference

Keremli Çaryýew
Taňryberdi Guwanjow
Goalies
Leung Manlong
Referee:
Li Ho Ching (HKG)

Baýjaýew (Taňňyýew, Gurbanow) – 00:28	1–0
Baýmyradow (Kakajanow, Aganyýazow) – 02:02	2–0
Nuryýew (Baýhanow, Baýmyradow) – 04:16	3–0
Gurbanow (Wahowskiý, Hydyrow) – 05:29	4–0
Annasaparow (Esenow, Döwletmyradow) – 08:35	5–0
Döwletmyradow (Geldimyradow, Kakabaýew) (SH) – 13:32	6–0
Kakajanow (Baýmyradow, Baýhanow) (PP) – 21:12	7–0
Durdyýew (Geldimyradow, Orazow) – 26:20	8–0
Baýmyradow (Baýhanow) – 33:01	9–0
Orazow (Durdyýew, Kakaýew) – 33:59	10–0
Baýmyradow (Nuryýew, Aganyýazow) – 35:45	11–0
Taňňyýew (Gurbanow, Baýjaýew) – 41:13	12–0
Geldimyradow – 43:09	13–0
Baýmyradow (Nuryýew, Aganyýazow) – 45:44	14–0
Baýhanow (Aganyýazow) – 46:03	15–0
Gurbanow (Wahowskiý, Taňňyýew) – 47:43	16–0
Döwletmyradow (Geldimyradow, Annasaparow) – 48:22	17–0
Aganyýazow (Baýhanow) (PP) – 52:11	18–0
Baýmyradow (Kakajanow, Baýhanow) – 52:49	19–0
Orazow – 53:38	20–0
Baýjaýew (Taňňyýew, Wahowskiý) – 54:14	21–0
Döwletmyradow – 54:53	22–0
Baýhanow (Baýmyradow, Kakajanow) – 55:32	23–0
Nuryýew (Baýhanow, Kakaýew) – 56:27	24–0
Aganyýazow (Baýmyradow, Baýjaýew) (SH) – 57:17	25–0
Döwletmyradow (Geldimyradow) – 58:55	26–0

12 min
Penalties
8 min
101
Shots
4

6 February; 20:30	India	1–19 (1–4, 0–6, 0–9)	Turkmenistan	Harbin Ice Hockey Arena, Harbin; Attendance: 1,108

Game reference

Lotus Chamba
Namgail Tundup
Goalies
Keremli Çaryýew
Taňryberdi Guwanjow
Referee:
Li Ho Ching (HKG)

S. Angchok (Lakdan, Kunzang) – 01:41	1–0
	1–1	01:54 – Geldimyradow (Döwletmyradow, Esenow)
	1–2	02:09 – Geldimyradow (Esenow, Döwletmyradow)
	1–3	08:02 – Kakabaýew (Döwletmyradow, Esenow)
	1–4	12:41 – Baýmyradow (Aganyýazow) (SH)
	1–5	28:05 – Baýmyradow (Nuryýew, Aganyýazow)
	1–6	32:00 – Nuryýew (Aganyýazow) (PP)
	1–7	34:16 – Orazow (Kakaýew, Durdyýew)
	1–8	34:51 – Nuryýew
	1–9	37:03 – Esenow (Annasaparow, Döwletmyradow) (PP)
	1–10	39:21 – Döwletmyradow (Kakabaýew) (SH)
	1–11	43:25 – Döwletmyradow (Geldimyradow, Kakabaýew)
	1–12	45:25 – Wahowskiý (Gurbanow, Taňňyýew) (PP)
	1–13	47:08 – Baýmyradow (Nuryýew)
	1–14	47:28 – Geldimyradow (Döwletmyradow)
	1–15	47:51 – Geldimyradow (Döwletmyradow)
	1–16	49:56 – Döwletmyradow (Geldimyradow) (PP)
	1–17	53:03 – Baýhanow (Nuryýew, Aganyýazow)
	1–18	53:32 – Wahowskiý (Baýjaýew)
	1–19	57:18 – Geldimyradow (Kakabaýew, Döwletmyradow)

22 min
Penalties
14 min
5
Shots
89

9 February; 9:00	Turkmenistan	1–5 (1–3, 0–2, 0–0)	Hong Kong	Harbin Ice Hockey Arena, Harbin; Attendance: 2,915

Game reference

Keremli Çaryýew
Goalies
Cheung Ching Ho
Referees:
Kang Tae-woo (KOR)
Liu Jiaqi (CHN)

	0–1	02:50 – Chan (Tong) (PP)
	0–2	07:13 – B. Tang (Chu, Cheng)
Wahowskiý (Baýjaýew, Hydyrow) (PP) – 11:56	1–2
	1–3	13:48 – B. Tang (Chu, Elmer) (PP)
	1–4	31:13 – Leung (Yam Ya.)
	1–5	38:48 – Chu (Elmer, Tong) (PP)

107 min
Penalties
28 min
29
Shots
25

9 February; 13:00	Macau	2–4 (0–2, 2–1, 0–1)	India	Harbin Ice Hockey Arena, Harbin; Attendance: 2,900

Game reference

Leung Manlong
Goalies
Lotus Chamba
Referee:
Faris Hakimin Yusoff (MAS)

	0–1	05:37 – Baba (Angchuk)
	0–2	12:24 – Ismail (A. Dorjay)
	0–3	27:50 – Angchuk (Angdus, Kunzang) (PP)
Sou (PP) – 33:05	1–3
Sou – 37:11	2–3
	2–4	47:40 – Angdus (T. Dorjay)

4 min
Penalties
14 min
23
Shots
42

=== Placement round ===
==== Placement 13–14 ====
10 February; 9:00	Macau	4–3 OT (0–1, 1–1, 2–1) (OT: 1–0)	Bahrain	Harbin Sport University Stadium, Harbin; Attendance: 507

Game reference

Leung Manlong
Goalies
Abdulla Al-Adhab
Referee:
Timur Morev (KAZ)

	0–1	18:11 – Hegazi (Al-Bahri, Masaud) (PP)
Shinoda (Sou) – 32:33	1–1
	1–2	33:16 – Masaud (Al-Salah, Hegazi)
	1–3	41:59 – Al-Mutawa (Masaud)
Sou (Hong, Shinoda) (PP) – 45:31	2–3
Yeung (Kong) – 52:52	3–3
Cheng (Wong, Leong) – 63:17	4–3

10 min
Penalties
14 min
43
Shots
21

==== Placement 11–12 ====
10 February; 13:00	Singapore	13–2 (5–0, 3–1, 5–1)	India	Harbin Sport University Stadium, Harbin; Attendance: 565

Game reference

Joshua Lee
Lee Chin Hao
Goalies
Lotus Chamba
Referee:
Li Ho Ching (HKG)

Kodrowski (Chua, Qian) (PP) – 07:22	1–0
B. Lee (Chua, Chan) (PP) – 09:52	2–0
B. Lee (Kodrowski, Chua) – 11:46	3–0
Qian (SH) – 14:40	4–0
B. Lee (Blakney, Kodrowski) – 17:44	5–0
Wintland (B. Lee, Qian) – 28:06	6–0
Goh (Chan) – 33:09	7–0
Kok – 34:02	8–0
	8–1	39:01 – Ismail (S. Angchok, Lakdan)
	8–2	41:09 – Lotus (Ismail, S. Angchok) (PP)
B. Lee (Kok) – 45:57	9–2
Chan (Kodrowski, Qian) (PP) – 49:33	10–2
O'Brien (Blakney) – 51:00	11–2
Chan (Chew) – 53:37	12–2
Kok (B. Lee, Wintland) – 54:12	13–2

6 min
Penalties
10 min
60
Shots
11

==== Placement 9–10 ====
10 February; 17:00	Kuwait	8–4 (3–2, 3–2, 2–0)	Turkmenistan	Harbin Sport University Stadium, Harbin; Attendance: 668

Game reference

Adam Barvík
Goalies
Keremli Çaryýew
Referees:
Anton Boryayev (KAZ)
Chae Young-jin (KOR)

	0–1	07:01 – Baýjaýew (Esenow, Kakabaýew)
Budzevich (Drozdetskikh) – 09:23	1–1
Vavra (PS) – 09:59	2–1
	2–2	12:29 – Baýjaýew (Esenow, Kakajanow)
Drozdetskikh (Budzevich, Tsibin) – 16:48	3–2
Tsibin (Drozdetskikh) – 28:29	4–2
Budzevich (Tsibin, Drozdetskikh) (PP) – 32:24	5–2
	5–3	34:31 – Wahowskiý (Gurbanow)
	5–4	35:59 – Gurbanow (Wahowskiý)
Budzevich (Al-Mari, Tsibin) – 39:05	6–4
Drozdetskikh (Budzevich) (SH) – 48:59	7–4
Al-Mari (Budzevich, Drozdetskikh) – 50:34	8–4

8 min
Penalties
8 min
37
Shots
34

==== Quarterfinals ranking ====
10 February; 21:00	Hong Kong	5–6 OT (2–0, 2–3, 1–2) (OT: 0–1)	Kyrgyzstan	Harbin Sport University Stadium, Harbin; Attendance: 1,136

Game reference

Cheung Ching Ho
Michael Gan
Goalies
Artem Vasilev
Arslan Maraimbekov
Referees:
Anton Boryayev (KAZ)
Liu Jiaqi (CHN)

Shum (Chu, Mak) – 15:58	1–0
Chu (Shum) – 19:12	2–0
	2–1	23:36 – Mirbekov
	2–2	28:54 – Ismanov (Egorov, Mirbekov)
Tong (Chu, Shum) – 29:08	3–2
Chu – 33:16	4–2
	4–3	39:46 – Mirbekov (Maksatbekov, Isamatov)
	4–4	54:25 – Abdyraev (Titov, Terentyev)
Elmer (Tong, Chu) (PP) – 57:00	5–4
	5–5	58:10 – Titov (Seifulov, Isamatov)
	5–6	62:27 – Abdyraev (Terentyev, Seifulov)

12 min
Penalties
6 min
21
Shots
50

=== Final round ===
Quarterfinals
11 February
Kazakhstan	24
Hong Kong	0
11 February
China	7
Chinese Taipei	2
11 February
South Korea	20
Kyrgyzstan	0
11 February
Japan	15
Thailand	2

Semifinals
13 February
Kazakhstan	3
China	1
13 February
South Korea	3
Japan (GWS)	4

Gold medal game
14 February
Kazakhstan	5
Japan	0
Bronze medal game
14 February
China	2
South Korea	5

==== Quarterfinals ====
11 February; 16:00	Kazakhstan	24–0 (8–0, 7–0, 9–0)	Hong Kong	Harbin Ice Hockey Arena, Harbin; Attendance: 2,991

Game reference

Maxim Pavlenko
Jelaladdin Amirbekov
Goalies
Cheung Ching Ho
David Lam
Referees:
Chae Young-jin (KOR)
Faris Hakimin Yusoff (MAS)

Ospanov (Borissevich, Stepanenko) – 01:16	1–0
Savitskiy (Likhotnikov, Panyukov) – 01:42	2–0
Rymarev (Daniyar, Omirbekov) – 03:21	3–0
Grents (Chaporov, Korolyov) – 11:31	4–0
Panyukov (Breus, Likhotnikov) – 12:12	5–0
Starchenko (Omirbekov, Rymarev) – 14:34	6–0
Grents (Chaporov, Butenko) – 17:12	7–0
Kolesnikov (Borissevich, Stepanenko) – 19:04	8–0
Starchenko (Stepanenko, Mikhailov) – 24:19	9–0
Rymarev – 27:53	10–0
Gaitamirov (Panyukov, Kolesnikov) – 30:10	11–0
Butenko (Grents, Chaporov) – 33:30	12–0
Panyukov (Likhotnikov, Korolyov) – 38:38	13–0
Kolesnikov (Ospanov, Borissevich) – 38:58	14–0
Daniyar (Beketayev, Rymarev) – 39:44	15–0
Beketayev (Omirbekov) – 40:19	16–0
Panyukov (Likhotnikov, Amirbekov) – 42:42	17–0
Starchenko (Rymarev, Daniyar) – 44:27	18–0
Daniyar (Borissevich, Savitskiy) (PP) – 51:32	19–0
Ospanov (Korolyov, Likhotnikov) – 54:31	20–0
Beketayev (Daniyar, Starchenko) – 54:49	21–0
Grents (Savitskiy, Likhotnikov) (PP) – 55:36	22–0
Gaitamirov (Chaporov) (SH) – 58:09	23–0
Rymarev (Beketayev, Daniyar) – 58:30	24–0

4 min
Penalties
8 min
80
Shots
9

11 February; 16:00	South Korea	20–0 (6–0, 11–0, 3–0)	Kyrgyzstan	Harbin Sport University Stadium, Harbin; Attendance: 1,060

Game reference

Ha Jung-ho
Goalies
Artem Vasilev
Arslan Maraimbekov
Referees:
Timur Morev (KAZ)
Shen Yen-chin (TPE)

Kang M. (Kim S.H., Kim D.) – 02:47	1–0
Kim S.Y. (Kang M., Kim S.H.) – 06:01	2–0
Lee H. (Oh, Kong) – 13:21	3–0
Kim S.Y. (Kim D., Kang M.) – 14:55	4–0
Kang Y. (Lee H., Kong) – 17:38	5–0
Lee S. (Kim S.Y.) – 18:38	6–0
Kim S.H. (Kang M., Kim S.Y.) – 22:35	7–0
Lee M.Y. (Kwon, Jeon) – 24:14	8–0
Kwon – 27:23	9–0
Lee C. (Kim S.W., Ahn) – 27:46	10–0
Lee C. (Ahn, Kim S.W.) – 32:13	11–0
Lee C. (Kim S.W., Nam) – 32:47	12–0
Kang M. (Kim S.H.) – 34:16	13–0
Kang M. (Kim S.H., Kim S.Y.) – 34:40	14–0
Jeon (Kwon) – 34:50	15–0
Ahn (Kim S.W.) (PP) – 35:26	16–0
Lee H. (Kong, Ahn) – 36:50	17–0
Lee S. (Kim S.Y., Kim S.H.) – 51:58	18–0
Kim S.W. (Nam, Ahn) – 54:18	19–0
Kim S.Y. (Kong, Lee S.) – 56:56	20–0

4 min
Penalties
4 min
55
Shots
11

11 February; 20:00	China	7–2 (1–1, 2–0, 4–1)	Chinese Taipei	Harbin Ice Hockey Arena, Harbin; Attendance: 3,211

Game reference

Sun Zehao
Goalies
Lee Yi-cheng
Chen Tai-yu
Referees:
Anton Boryayev (KAZ)
Konstantin Chubenko (KAZ)

	0–1	06:23 – Chen K. (Wang P.)
Zhang Z. (Zhang P., Zuo) (PP) – 09:27	1–1
Yan (Han, Zuo) – 28:32	2–1
Zhang P. (Hou, Wang) (PP) – 35:10	3–1
Chen K. (Zhang Z., Zhang P.) – 41:17	4–1
Hou (Wang, Han) – 42:55	5–1
Yu J. (Hou) – 48:04	6–1
Zhang P. (Hou, Zhang J.) (PP) – 50:01	7–1
	7–2	51:04 – Lin J. (Lin H.)

2 min
Penalties
18 min
65
Shots
16

11 February; 20:00	Japan	15–2 (3–1, 6–1, 6–0)	Thailand	Harbin Sport University Stadium, Harbin; Attendance: 1,163

Game reference

Eiki Sato
Issa Otsuka
Goalies
Ben Kleineschay
Referees:
Li Ho Ching (HKG)
Liu Jiaqi (CHN)

Kobayashi (Nakajima) – 03:36	1–0
Suzuki (Kobayashi, Yoneyama) – 14:12	2–0
Osawa (Yamada, Ishida) – 18:54	3–0
	3–1	19:34 – Aarola (Lampson, Kindborn)
K. Otsu (Takagi, Hayata) – 22:26	4–1
Nakajima (Hayata, Yoneyama) – 26:23	5–1
	5–2	28:35 – Forstner (Lampson)
Irikura (Hitosato, Yoneyama) (PP) – 32:41	6–2
Isogai (Hitosato, Yoneyama) (PP) – 33:07	7–2
Kobayashi (Suzuki, Hayata) – 35:51	8–2
Irikura (Hitosato, Hayata) – 38:32	9–2
Yamada (Isogai, Irikura) – 40:22	10–2
Takagi (K. Otsu, Osawa) – 41:56	11–2
Kobayashi (Yoneyama, Nakajima) – 43:54	12–2
Hayata (Nakajima) – 44:07	13–2
Halliday – 44:56	14–2
K. Otsu (Osawa, Yoneyama) – 50:13	15–2

10 min
Penalties
12 min
79
Shots
10

==== Semifinals ====
13 February; 10:00	Kazakhstan	3–1 (0–0, 2–0, 1–1)	China	Harbin Ice Hockey Arena, Harbin; Attendance: 3,144

Game reference

Andrey Shutov
Goalies
Chen Shifeng
Referees:
Chae Young-jin (KOR)
Shen Yen-chin (TPE)

Starchenko (Rymarev, Beketayev) – 36:45	1–0
Grents (Mikhailov, Ospanov) – 39:47	2–0
	2–1	Wang (Li M.) – 58:47
Breus (Likhotnikov) – 59:12	3–1

10 min
Penalties
8 min
58
Shots
12

13 February; 14:00	South Korea	3–4 GWS (2–1, 1–1, 0–1) (OT: 0–0) (SO: 0–1)	Japan	Harbin Ice Hockey Arena, Harbin; Attendance: 2,582

Game reference

Lee Yeon-seung
Goalies
Yuta Narisawa
Referees:
Konstantin Chubenko (KAZ)
Anton Boryayev (KAZ)

Ahn (Kim S.W., Kim W.) – 03:12	1–0
Kim S.Y. (Kang M., Kong) (PP) – 14:25	2–0
	2–1	19:21 – Kobayashi (Nakajima, Suzuki)
Kim S.H. – 25:29	3–1
	3–2	28:05 – Isogai (Yoneyama, Nakajima) (PP)
	3–3	58:45 – Nakajima (Yoneyama, H. Sato)

Ahn (miss)
Kim S.W. (miss)
Kong (miss)
Shootout
Takagi
(miss) Kobayashi
(miss) Irikura
Suzuki
8 min
Penalties
10 min
32
Shots
29

==== Bronze medal game ====
14 February; 10:00	South Korea	5–2 (0–1, 3–0, 2–1)	China	Harbin Ice Hockey Arena, Harbin; Attendance: 3,035

Game reference

Lee Yeon-seung
Goalies
Chen Shifeng
Referees:
Anton Boryayev (KAZ)
Timur Morev (KAZ)

	0–1	07:27 – Li Z. (Hou, Yu J.)
Oh (Kang Y.) – 26:27	1–1
Kim S.Y. (Lee H., Kim W.) – 35:30	2–1
Kong (Kim S.W., Kang M.) – 39:46	3–1
	3–2	42:00 – Zhang Z. (Yan)
Lee C. (Lee S.) (PP) – 43:06	4–2
Lee S. (Lee C., Ahn) (PP) – 48:10	5–2

12 min
Penalties
14 min
40
Shots
22

==== Gold medal game ====
14 February; 14:00	Kazakhstan	5–0 (1–0, 2–0, 2–0)	Japan	Harbin Ice Hockey Arena, Harbin; Attendance: 2,952

Game reference

Andrey Shutov
Goalies
Yuta Narisawa
Referees:
Chae Young-jin (KOR)
Konstantin Chubenko (KAZ)

Buyalskiy (Daniyar) – 17:34	1–0
Breus (Likhotnikov, Gaitamirov) – 21:02	2–0
Starchenko (Beketayev, Omirbekov) (PP) – 37:59	3–0
Panyukov (Starchenko, Rymarev) (PP) – 42:24	4–0
Panyukov – 44:23	5–0

4 min
Penalties
12 min
26
Shots
13

== Final standing ==
Rank	Team	Pld	W	OW	OL	L
1st place, gold medalist(s)	Kazakhstan	8	8	0	0	0
2nd place, silver medalist(s)	Japan	8	4	1	0	3
3rd place, bronze medalist(s)	South Korea	8	5	1	1	1
4	China	8	3	0	1	4
5	Chinese Taipei	6	1	0	0	5
6	Thailand	6	0	0	0	6
7	Kyrgyzstan	5	2	2	0	1
8	Hong Kong	5	3	0	1	1
9	Kuwait	4	3	0	1	0
10	Turkmenistan	4	2	0	0	2
11	Singapore	4	2	0	0	2
12	India	4	1	0	0	3
13	Macau	4	0	1	0	3
14	Bahrain	4	0	0	1	3
