= Hong Kong at the 2025 Asian Winter Games =

- Flag of Hong Kong
- IOC code: HKG
- NOC: Sports Federation and Olympic Committee of Hong Kong, China

in Harbin, China 7 February 2025 – 14 February 2025
- Competitors: 73 in 6 sports
- Flag bearers: Adrian Yung & Lam Ching Yan
- Medals: Gold 0 Silver 0 Bronze 0 Total 0

Asian Winter Games appearances
- 1986; 1990; 1996; 1999; 2003; 2007; 2011; 2017; 2025; 2029

Hong Kong competed in the 2025 Asian Winter Games in Harbin, China from February 7 to 14. The country sent 74 athletes to compete within six sports which is the largest delegation Hong Kong have sent within the Asian Winter Games. Alpine skier Adrian Yung and short track speed skater Lam Ching Yan were the NOC's flagbearers during the opening ceremony.

Hong Kong made its debut in the curling, alpine skiing and speed skating. Hong Kong finished the Games with no medals, and a top placement of fourth in the men's curling competition.

== Competitors ==
The following table lists the Hong Kong delegation per sport and gender.

Sport	Men	Women	Total
Alpine skiing	4	4	8
Curling	5	5	10
Figure skating	2	2	4
Ice hockey	23	22	45
Short-track speed skating	4	2	6
Speed skating	1	1	2
Total	39	36	73

- Both Speed skaters will also compete in short-track speed skating

== Alpine skiing ==
Hong Kong marked their debut within the Alpine skiing competitions in which the team consists of four men and four women.

Men

Athlete	Event	Run 1		Run 2		Total	
Athlete	Event	Time	Rank	Time	Rank	Time	Rank
Lu Kin Pok	Slalom	1:00.96	37	1:01.55	31	2:02.51	31
Lucas Wong Chi Hao	Slalom	54.15	24	53.42	20	1:47.57	19
Wu Hao Yang	Slalom	Did not start					
Adrian Yung	Slalom	49.00	12	47.80	8	1:36.80	10

Women

Athlete	Event	Run 1		Run 2		Total	
Athlete	Event	Time	Rank	Time	Rank	Time	Rank
Isabella Kao Shin Yuan	Slalom	1:02.92	23	1:01.53	18	2:04.45	18
Aerin Alexandra King	Slalom	56.77	16	56.22	16	1:52.99	14
Eloise Yung Shih King	Slalom	55.80	15	54.69	13	1:50.49	13
Samantha Zhong Hiu Yiu	Slalom	DSQ		Did not advance			

== Curling ==
Hong Kong marked their debut within the Curling competitions in which the team consists of five men and five women.

Summary

Team	Event	Group stage									Qualification	Semifinal	Final / BM	
Team	Event	Opposition Score	Opposition Score	Opposition Score	Opposition Score	Opposition Score	Opposition Score	Opposition Score	Opposition Score	Rank	Opposition Score	Opposition Score	Opposition Score	Rank
Jason Chang; Martin Yan; Ching Nam Cheng; Cheuk Hei Chung; Chi Lap Ma	Men's team	China; L 2–9	Thailand; W 16–1	Japan; W 7–3	Qatar; W 10-2	Saudi Arabia; W 15-1	—N/a			2 Q	Kazakhstan; W 8–5	South Korea; L 2–13	China; L 3–10	4
Ling-Yue Hung; Ada Shang; Pianpian Hu; Yuen Ting Wong; Ka Chan	Women's team	Philippines; L 2–7	Thailand; W 9–3	South Korea; L 2–9	China; L 3–9	Japan; L 2–9	Chinese Taipei; W 8–1	Qatar; W 15–1	Kazakhstan; L 3–6	6	Did not advance			6
Ling-Yue Hung; Martin Yan	Mixed doubles	Chinese Taipei; W 9–8	Japan; L 3–9	Kuwait; W 11–2	Thailand; W 14–5	Mongolia; W 9–2	—N/a			2 Q	South Korea; L 4–11	Did not advance		5

=== Men's tournament ===
Hong Kong entered a men's team.

Round robin

Pos	Team	Skip	Pld	W	L	W–L	PF	PA	DSC	Qualification
1	China	Xu Xiaoming	5	5	0	—	63	10	36.46	Semifinals
2	Hong Kong	Jason Chang	5	4	1	—	50	16	62.23	Qualification
3	Japan	Ryo Aoki	5	3	2	—	52	21	63.73	Qualification
4	Qatar	Nasser Al-Yafei	5	2	3	—	21	41	138.50	
5	Saudi Arabia	Munir Al-Beelbisi	5	1	4	—	22	55	128.47	
6	Thailand	Kaewjeen / Mahattanasakul	5	0	5	—	8	73	130.14	

Source: Official website

Draw 1

Sunday, 9 February, 13:00

Sheet C	1	2	3	4	5	6	7	8	Final
China 🔨	3	0	0	2	2	2	0	X	9
Hong Kong	0	0	1	0	0	0	1	X	2

Draw 2

Sunday, 9 February, 21:00

Sheet E	1	2	3	4	5	6	7	8	Final
Thailand	0	0	0	0	0	1	X	X	1
Hong Kong 🔨	4	3	1	3	5	0	X	X	16

Draw 4

Monday, 10 February, 14:00

Sheet D	1	2	3	4	5	6	7	8	Final
Hong Kong	0	0	2	1	0	0	1	3	7
Japan 🔨	0	1	0	0	0	2	0	0	3

Draw 6

Tuesday, 11 February, 14:00

Sheet B	1	2	3	4	5	6	7	8	Final
Hong Kong	3	1	2	1	0	3	X	X	10
Qatar 🔨	0	0	0	0	2	0	X	X	2

Draw 7

Wednesday, 12 February, 9:00

Sheet A	1	2	3	4	5	6	7	8	Final
Saudi Arabia	0	0	0	0	0	1	X	X	1
Hong Kong 🔨	4	3	2	4	2	0	X	X	15

Qualification

Thursday, 13 February, 14:00

Sheet C	1	2	3	4	5	6	7	8	Final
Kazakhstan	1	0	1	0	3	0	0	0	5
Hong Kong 🔨	0	1	0	3	0	2	1	1	8

Semifinal

Thursday, 13 February, 19:00

Sheet D	1	2	3	4	5	6	7	8	Final
Hong Kong	0	0	1	0	1	0	X	X	2
South Korea 🔨	4	5	0	2	0	2	X	X	13

Bronze Medal Game

Friday, 14 February, 9:00

Sheet C	1	2	3	4	5	6	7	8	Final
China 🔨	3	0	2	0	2	0	3	X	10
Hong Kong	0	1	0	1	0	1	0	X	3

=== Women's tournament ===
Hong Kong entered a women's team.

Round robin

Pos	Team	Skip	Pld	W	L	W–L	PF	PA	DSC	Qualification
1	South Korea	Gim Eun-ji	8	8	0	—	63	14	45.90	Semifinals
2	China	Wang Rui	8	7	1	—	85	21	38.69	Semifinals
3	Japan	Yuina Miura	8	6	2	—	68	30	58.25	Semifinals
4	Kazakhstan	Angelina Ebauyer	8	5	3	—	55	39	54.81	Semifinals
5	Philippines	Kathleen Dubberstein	8	4	4	—	61	36	85.56	
6	Hong Kong	Hung Ling Yue	8	3	5	—	44	45	115.69	
7	Chinese Taipei	Yang Ko	8	2	6	—	29	75	107.27	
8	Thailand	Phichayathida Jaosap	8	1	7	—	19	91	128.48	
9	Qatar	Amna Al-Qaet	8	0	8	—	11	84	180.65	

Source: Official website

Draw 1

Sunday, 9 February, 9:00

Sheet B	1	2	3	4	5	6	7	8	Final
Philippines 🔨	1	1	3	1	0	1	0	X	7
Hong Kong	0	0	0	0	1	0	1	X	2

Draw 2

Sunday, 9 February, 17:00

Sheet A	1	2	3	4	5	6	7	8	Final
Thailand	1	0	0	1	0	1	0	X	3
Hong Kong 🔨	0	1	3	0	3	0	2	X	9

Draw 4

Monday, 10 February, 19:00

Sheet C	1	2	3	4	5	6	7	8	Final
South Korea 🔨	1	0	1	1	3	3	0	X	9
Hong Kong	0	1	0	0	0	0	1	X	2

Draw 5

Tuesday, 11 February, 9:00

Sheet D	1	2	3	4	5	6	7	8	Final
Hong Kong	0	0	0	0	2	1	0	X	3
China 🔨	2	1	2	1	0	0	3	X	9

Draw 6

Tuesday, 11 February, 19:00

Sheet E	1	2	3	4	5	6	7	8	Final
Hong Kong	0	0	0	0	2	0	0	X	2
Japan 🔨	2	1	1	2	0	1	2	X	9

Draw 7

Wednesday, 12 February, 9:00

Sheet C	1	2	3	4	5	6	7	8	Final
Hong Kong 🔨	1	1	2	2	1	0	1	X	8
Chinese Taipei	0	0	0	0	0	1	0	X	1

Draw 8

Wednesday, 12 February, 19:00

Sheet D	1	2	3	4	5	6	7	8	Final
Qatar	1	0	0	0	0	0	X	X	1
Hong Kong 🔨	0	5	4	2	1	3	X	X	15

Draw 9

Thursday, 13 February, 9:00

Sheet B	1	2	3	4	5	6	7	8	Final
Hong Kong	0	1	0	2	0	0	0	X	3
Kazakhstan 🔨	0	0	2	0	1	3	0	X	6

=== Mixed doubles tournament ===
Hong Kong entered a mixed doubles pair.

Round robin

Pos	Team	Athletes	Pld	W	L	W–L	PF	PA	DSC	Qualification
1	Japan	Koana / Aoki	5	5	0	—	49	8	57.23	Semifinals
2	Hong Kong	Hung / Yan	5	4	1	—	46	26	56.68	Qualification
3	Chinese Taipei	Chou / Liu	5	3	2	—	44	25	65.56	Qualification
4	Thailand	Sonkham / Jearateerawit	5	2	3	—	29	46	142.12	
5	Kuwait	Abdulateef / Al-Kandari	5	1	4	—	14	41	197.23	
6	Mongolia	Enkhzayaa / Bayar	5	0	5	—	16	52	134.74	

Source: Official website

Draw 2

Tuesday, 4 February, 14:00

Sheet C	1	2	3	4	5	6	7	8	Final
Hong Kong 🔨	3	0	2	0	3	1	0	0	9
Chinese Taipei	0	4	0	1	0	0	2	1	8

Draw 3

Wednesday, 5 February, 10:00

Sheet B	1	2	3	4	5	6	7	8	Final
Japan 🔨	1	1	2	1	1	0	3	X	9
Hong Kong	0	0	0	0	0	3	0	X	3

Draw 4

Wednesday, 5 February, 14:00

Sheet D	1	2	3	4	5	6	7	8	Final
Kuwait	0	0	1	0	0	0	1	X	2
Hong Kong 🔨	5	1	0	1	2	2	0	X	11

Draw 7

Thursday, 6 February, 14:00

Sheet A	1	2	3	4	5	6	7	8	Final
Thailand	1	0	1	3	0	0	0	X	5
Hong Kong 🔨	0	4	0	0	5	2	3	X	14

Draw 8

Thursday, 6 February, 18:00

Sheet E	1	2	3	4	5	6	7	8	Final
Hong Kong 🔨	1	0	4	1	0	2	1	X	9
Mongolia	0	1	0	0	1	0	0	X	2

Qualification

Friday, 7 February, 9:00

Sheet B	1	2	3	4	5	6	7	8	Final
Hong Kong 🔨	0	0	0	3	0	1	0	X	4
South Korea	1	3	2	0	2	0	3	X	11

== Figure skating ==
Hong Kong competed in the figure skating competitions. The team consists of four athletes.

Athlete(s)	Event	SP		FP		Total	
Athlete(s)	Event	Points	Rank	Points	Rank	Points	Rank
Lincoln Yuen Lap Kan	Men's	54.24	13	47.14	12	101.38	12
Jarke Zhao Heung Lai	Men's	54.52	12	47.98	11	102.50	11
Chow Hiu Yau	Women's	38.11	13	35.62	14	73.73	14
Joanna So	Women's	36.22	15	40.30	11	76.52	11

== Ice hockey ==
=== Men's tournament ===
Hong Kong qualified a men's hockey team of 23 athletes.

- Chan Ho Pong
- Cheng Chung Pan Justin
- Cheung Ching Ho
- Chu Ryan Chak Hay
- Elmer Colby Ruben
- Gan Michael Xy Kam
- Lam Tsz Wing David
- Lee Ryan Yuen Chong
- Leung Tony
- Mak Randolph Dash
- Ngan Cheuk Long
- Sham Alvin Cheuk Him
- Shum Michael Lee Heng
- Tang Bryan
- Tang Shin Ming Jasper
- To Hei Yu
- Tong Maxwell Wai Hin
- Wang Tsan Lam
- Wong Ka Ho
- Wong Yin Hay Yannick
- Yam Yau
- Yam Yi
- Yuen Howard Ho Yeung

Legend

- G– Goalie D = Defense F = Forward

Group stage

Pos	Team	Pld	W	OW	OL	L	GF	GA	GD	Pts	Qualification
1	Hong Kong	3	3	0	0	0	61	2	+59	9	Quarterfinals
2	Turkmenistan	3	2	0	0	1	46	6	+40	6	Placement 9–10
3	India	3	1	0	0	2	5	51	−46	3	Placement 11–12
4	Macau	3	0	0	0	3	3	56	−53	0	Placement 13–14

Source: OCA

3 February; 21:00	Hong Kong	26–1 (12–0, 6–0, 8–1)	Macau	Harbin Ice Hockey Arena, Harbin; Attendance: 1,608

Game reference

Cheung Ching Ho
David Lam
Goalies
Leung Manlong
Referee:
Wang Gongbo (CHN)

Tong (B. Tang) – 01:18	1–0
Wang (SH) – 03:07	2–0
Chu (Yam Ya.) (SH) – 03:58	3–0
Lee (Sham) – 05:28	4–0
B. Tang (J. Tang, Y. Wong) – 05:58	5–0
Chan (Leung, Wang) – 06:40	6–0
Tong (B. Tang) – 08:21	7–0
J. Tang (Ngan, Yam Ya.) – 09:43	8–0
Wang (To, Sham) – 10:04	9–0
Tong (Yam Ya.) – 12:46	10–0
Tong (Lee, To) (PP) – 16:56	11–0
B. Tang (Elmer, Cheng) – 19:25	12–0
B. Tang (Lee, Tong) – 22:37	13–0
Mak (Cheng, Leung) – 25:49	14–0
Lee (Chu, Wong K.) – 28:43	15–0
J. Tang – 30:09	16–0
Tong (Chu, Yam Ya.) – 34:18	17–0
B. Tang (Tong, Chu) – 39:14	18–0
B. Tang (Tong, Yuen) – 45:01	19–0
Tong (Chu, B. Tang) – 45:39	20–0
Cheng (Elmer) – 46:31	21–0
Wong K. – 47:14	22–0
Chu (Tong) – 50:37	23–0
	23–1	55:20 – Hong (SH)
Elmer (B. Tang) (SH) – 56:33	24–1
Wang (B. Tang, Chan) (SH) – 57:47	25–1
Tong (Mak, B. Tang) – 59:50	26–1

10 min
Penalties
10 min
111
Shots
4

5 February; 17:00	Hong Kong	30–0 (10–0, 12–0, 8–0)	India	Harbin Sport University Stadium, Harbin; Attendance: 569

Game reference

Cheung Ching Ho
Michael Gan
Goalies
Lotus Chamba
Namgail Tundup
Referee:
Konstantin Chubenko (KAZ)

B. Tang – 00:51	1–0
Elmer (Cheng) – 01:23	2–0
Chu – 05:44	3–0
Mak (J. Tang, Tong) – 08:05	4–0
B. Tang (Lee, Mak) – 09:22	5–0
Chu (B. Tang, Shum) – 10:21	6–0
Chu (B. Tang, Shum) – 18:28	7–0
Shum (Lee, Mak) – 19:06	8–0
Yam Ya. (Cheng) – 19:33	9–0
Elmer (Cheng, Yam Ya.) – 19:44	10–0
Tong (J. Tang, Ngan) – 20:52	11–0
Cheng (Y. Wong) (SH) – 23:25	12–0
Lee (Chu) – 26:23	13–0
Lee (J. Tang, Tong) (PP) – 29:50	14–0
Chu (Mak, B. Tang) – 30:17	15–0
B. Tang – 30:37	16–0
Tong (J. Tang, Leung) – 32:53	17–0
Y. Wong (Chu) – 34:04	18–0
Ngan (Yam Ya., Chan) – 36:39	19–0
Chu (J. Tang, Yuen) – 37:46	20–0
Wang (Cheng) – 38:21	21–0
Yam Ya. (Chu) (PP) – 39:57	22–0
Ngan (Shum, B. Tang) (PP) – 41:48	23–0
Chu (Yam Ya., To) – 42:02	24–0
Tong (J. Tang, Cheng) – 43:18	25–0
J. Tang (Cheng) – 43:46	26–0
Mak (Sham, Lee) (PP) – 49:40	27–0
B. Tang – 49:50	28–0
B. Tang (Chu) – 56:25	29–0
Tong (B. Tang, Wong K.) – 58:58	30–0

10 min
Penalties
12 min
85
Shots
1

9 February; 9:00	Turkmenistan	1–5 (1–3, 0–2, 0–0)	Hong Kong	Harbin Ice Hockey Arena, Harbin; Attendance: 2,915

Game reference

Keremli Çaryýew
Goalies
Cheung Ching Ho
Referees:
Kang Tae-woo (KOR)
Liu Jiaqi (CHN)

	0–1	02:50 – Chan (Tong) (PP)
	0–2	07:13 – B. Tang (Chu, Cheng)
Wahowskiý (Baýjaýew, Hydyrow) (PP) – 11:56	1–2
	1–3	13:48 – B. Tang (Chu, Elmer) (PP)
	1–4	31:13 – Leung (Yam Ya.)
	1–5	38:48 – Chu (Elmer, Tong) (PP)

107 min
Penalties
28 min
29
Shots
25

At the conclusion of the men's ice hockey match between Hong Kong and Turkmenistan, Turkmenistani players attacked members of the Hong Kong team. The Sports Federation and Olympic Committee of Hong Kong, China, issued a statement "strongly condemning" the incident. Three Turkmenistani players Erkin Kakabayev, Arslan Geldimyradov, and Begench Dovletmyradov attacked several Hong Kong players, with the altercation lasting several minutes before referees were able to restore order. While none of the Hong Kong players sustained serious injuries, three were taken to the hospital as a precaution, including one who required stitches on his hand. The IIHF ultimately suspended four Turkmenistani players Kakabayev, Geldimyradov, Dovletmyradov, and Novruz Bayhanov from the remainder of the competition.

Quarterfinals playoff

10 February; 21:00	Hong Kong	5–6 OT (2–0, 2–3, 1–2) (OT: 0–1)	Kyrgyzstan	Harbin Sport University Stadium, Harbin; Attendance: 1,136

Game reference

Cheung Ching Ho
Michael Gan
Goalies
Artem Vasilev
Arslan Maraimbekov
Referees:
Anton Boryayev (KAZ)
Liu Jiaqi (CHN)

Shum (Chu, Mak) – 15:58	1–0
Chu (Shum) – 19:12	2–0
	2–1	23:36 – Mirbekov
	2–2	28:54 – Ismanov (Egorov, Mirbekov)
Tong (Chu, Shum) – 29:08	3–2
Chu – 33:16	4–2
	4–3	39:46 – Mirbekov (Maksatbekov, Isamatov)
	4–4	54:25 – Abdyraev (Titov, Terentyev)
Elmer (Tong, Chu) (PP) – 57:00	5–4
	5–5	58:10 – Titov (Seifulov, Isamatov)
	5–6	62:27 – Abdyraev (Terentyev, Seifulov)

12 min
Penalties
6 min
21
Shots
50

Quarterfinals

11 February; 16:00	Kazakhstan	24–0 (8–0, 7–0, 9–0)	Hong Kong	Harbin Ice Hockey Arena, Harbin; Attendance: 2,991

Game reference

Maxim Pavlenko
Jelaladdin Amirbekov
Goalies
Cheung Ching Ho
David Lam
Referees:
Chae Young-jin (KOR)
Faris Hakimin Yusoff (MAS)

Ospanov (Borissevich, Stepanenko) – 01:16	1–0
Savitskiy (Likhotnikov, Panyukov) – 01:42	2–0
Rymarev (Daniyar, Omirbekov) – 03:21	3–0
Grents (Chaporov, Korolyov) – 11:31	4–0
Panyukov (Breus, Likhotnikov) – 12:12	5–0
Starchenko (Omirbekov, Rymarev) – 14:34	6–0
Grents (Chaporov, Butenko) – 17:12	7–0
Kolesnikov (Borissevich, Stepanenko) – 19:04	8–0
Starchenko (Stepanenko, Mikhailov) – 24:19	9–0
Rymarev – 27:53	10–0
Gaitamirov (Panyukov, Kolesnikov) – 30:10	11–0
Butenko (Grents, Chaporov) – 33:30	12–0
Panyukov (Likhotnikov, Korolyov) – 38:38	13–0
Kolesnikov (Ospanov, Borissevich) – 38:58	14–0
Daniyar (Beketayev, Rymarev) – 39:44	15–0
Beketayev (Omirbekov) – 40:19	16–0
Panyukov (Likhotnikov, Amirbekov) – 42:42	17–0
Starchenko (Rymarev, Daniyar) – 44:27	18–0
Daniyar (Borissevich, Savitskiy) (PP) – 51:32	19–0
Ospanov (Korolyov, Likhotnikov) – 54:31	20–0
Beketayev (Daniyar, Starchenko) – 54:49	21–0
Grents (Savitskiy, Likhotnikov) (PP) – 55:36	22–0
Gaitamirov (Chaporov) (SH) – 58:09	23–0
Rymarev (Beketayev, Daniyar) – 58:30	24–0

4 min
Penalties
8 min
80
Shots
9

=== Women's tournament ===
- Chau Nga Sze
- Cheng Man Ying Katrina
- Cheung Tsz Ching
- Cheung Wing Yan
- Chim Agnes
- Fong Chloe Beatriz
- Ho Janice Qing Qing
- Ip Estelle Claudia
- Kwok Hoi Kei Ophelia
- Lam Andrea Winola
- Lau Yeuk Ting
- Leung Tsui Shan Aman
- Li Adrienne May
- Li Ching Laam
- Li Lloren Olivia
- Mok Hei Lam
- Ng Renee
- So Jasmine Hoi Kiu
- Tam Wing Hei
- Tsui Chi Yau Myra
- Wang Apple
- Wong Charleen
- Wong Ka Wing
- Legend: G = Goalie, D = Defense, F = Forward

Preliminary round

Pos	Team	Pld	W	OW	OL	L	GF	GA	GD	Pts	Qualification
1	Kazakhstan	4	3	1	0	0	27	1	+26	11	Final round
2	South Korea	4	3	0	1	0	22	3	+19	10	Final round
3	Chinese Taipei	4	2	0	0	2	13	10	+3	6	
4	Thailand	4	1	0	0	3	3	25	−22	3	
5	Hong Kong	4	0	0	0	4	2	28	−26	0	

Source: OCA

3 February; 19:30	Hong Kong	0–12 (0–4, 0–5, 0–3)	Kazakhstan	Harbin Sport University Stadium, Harbin; Attendance: 1,133

Game reference

Mok Hei Lam
Goalies
Arina Chshyokolova
Referees:
Liu Lu (CHN)
Miyuki Nakayama (JPN)

0–1	08:31 – M. Sayakhatkyzy (D. Sayakhatkyzy, Voronova)
0–2	11:21 – D. Sayakhatkyzy (Voronova, Zubkova)
0–3	13:27 – Sviridova (Pyatkova, Aldabergenova)
0–4	18:39 – D. Sayakhatkyzy (Ashimova, Sviridova)
0–5	20:35 – Tursynova (Shegay)
0–6	24:43 – Orazbayeva (Moldabay, Filimonova)
0–7	26:22 – D. Sayakhatkyzy (Butorina, Zubkova)
0–8	38:19 – Zubkova (Olzhabayeva, Ashimova)
0–9	38:28 – M. Sayakhatkyzy (Butorina, Voronova)
0–10	50:15 – Moldabay (Tursynova, Filimonova)
0–11	56:24 – M. Sayakhatkyzy (Sviridova)
0–12	58:15 – Kutsenko (Koroleva)

4 min
Penalties
2 min
10
Shots
63

4 February; 15:30	South Korea	8–0 (2–0, 3–0, 3–0)	Hong Kong	Harbin Sport University Stadium, Harbin; Attendance: 1,121

Game reference

Kim Yeon-ju
Bae Jeong-yeon
Goalies
Mok Hei Lam
Referees:
Song Meina (CHN)
Wan Mei Wah (MAS)

Park Ji-Y. (Lee S., Eom) (PP) – 07:04	1–0
Kim S. (Park J.A., Lee E. Jr.) – 12:24	2–0
Choi (Jung S., Kim M.) – 22:08	3–0
Lee E. Jr. (Kim D.) – 28:08	4–0
Park J.A. (SH) – 36:28	5–0
Lee E. Sr. (Lee E. Jr., Kim S.) – 40:28	6–0
Eom (Choi, Park Ji-Y.) – 48:48	7–0
Kim S. (Lee E. Jr.) (PP) – 56:33	8–0

2 min
Penalties
16 min
76
Shots
5

8 February; 19:30	Hong Kong	1–2 (0–0, 1–1, 0–1)	Thailand	Harbin Sport University Stadium, Harbin; Attendance: 1,097

Game reference

Mok Hei Lam
Goalies
Thamida Kunthadapakorn
Referees:
Miyuki Nakayama (JPN)
Song Meina (CHN)

Lam (Tsui, Ip) – 25:47	1–0
	1–1	38:54 – Sakchaicharoenkul (Vorawat, Panyamaneerat)
	1–2	51:26 – Vorawat (Thamma, Jittresin)

6 min
Penalties
4 min
32
Shots
25

9 February; 19:30	Chinese Taipei	6–1 (2–0, 4–0, 0–1)	Hong Kong	Harbin Sport University Stadium, Harbin; Attendance: 1,048

Game reference

Hsu Tzu-ting
Wang Yun-tzu
Goalies
Mok Hei Lam
Olivia LLoren
Referees:
Lee Kyung-sun (KOR)
Song Meina (CHN)

Chang E.N. (Lin C., Huang Y.) – 09:35	1–0
Kao (Hsieh) – 17:24	2–0
Huang Y. (Liu Y., Lin Y.) – 28:52	3–0
Chang E.W. (Hsieh, Yeh H.) – 30:20	4–0
Chang E.W. (Hsieh) – 33:49	5–0
Yeh H. (Hsieh, Sha) – 37:19	6–0
	6–1	54:20 – C. Wong (Wong K.)

0 min
Penalties
0 min
38
Shots
14

== Short track speed skating ==
Hong Kong is scheduled to compete in Short track speed skating.

Men

Athlete	Event	Heat		Quarterfinal		Semifinal		Final	
Athlete	Event	Time	Rank	Time	Rank	Time	Rank	Time	Rank
Sidney Chu	500 m	44.240	3	Did not advance					
Kwok Tsz Fung	500 m	44.242	2 Q	44.527	5	Did not advance			
Kwok Tsz Ho	500 m	46.970	5	Did not advance					
Sidney Chu	1000 m	1:41.993	2	1:28.973	5	Did not advance			
Kwok Tsz Fung	1000 m	1:28.840	3	1:28.030	4 q	1:28.014	6 FB	1:34.790	8
Kwok Tsz Ho	1000 m	1:34.858	4	Did not advance					
Sidney Chu	1500 m	—N/a		2:24.516	3 Q	2:50.806	6 ADVFB	2:32.786	12
Kwok Tsz Fung	1500 m	—N/a		2:21.135	4 q	2:28.550	6	Did not advance	
Kwok Tsz Ho	1500 m	—N/a		2:34.361	5	Did not advance			
Sidney Chu; Kwok Tsz Fung; Kwok Tsz Ho; Marvin Chen Jiale	5000 m relay	—N/a				7:39.413	3 FB	7:29.073	6

Women

Athlete	Event	Heat		Quarterfinal		Semifinal		Final	
Athlete	Event	Time	Rank	Time	Rank	Time	Rank	Time	Rank
Lam Ching Yan	500 m	45.868	2 Q	44.458	4	Did not advance			
Nicole Law Ching Shun	500 m	49.678	5	Did not advance					
Lam Ching Yan	1000 m	1:31.786	2 Q	1:35.088	3	Did not advance			
Lam Ching Yan	1500 m	—N/a		2:34.118	2 Q	3:07.998	4 FB	2:41.886	12
Nicole Law Ching Shun	1500 m	—N/a		2:52.174	4	Did not advance			

Mixed

Athlete	Event	Quarterfinal		Semifinal		Final	
Athlete	Event	Time	Rank	Time	Rank	Time	Rank
Lam Ching Yan; Nicole Law Ching Shun; Sidney Chu; Kwok Tsz Fung; Kwok Tsz Ho; Marvin Chen Jiale	2000 m relay	PEN		Did not advance			

Qualification legend: FA - Qualify to medal final; FB - Qualify to consolation final

== Speed skating ==
Hong Kong are set to make their debut in Speed skating.

Athlete	Event	Time	Rank
Sidney Chu	Men's 100 m	10.94	18
Sidney Chu	Men's 500 m	39.42	18
Sidney Chu	Men's 1000 m	1:19.38	18
Nicole Law Ching Shun	Women's 100 m	12.56	17
Nicole Law Ching Shun	Women's 500 m	46.87	18
Nicole Law Ching Shun	Women's 1000 m	1:37.38	19
