= Bahrain at the 2025 Asian Winter Games =

- Flag of Bahrain
- IOC code: BHR
- NOC: Bahrain Olympic Committee

in Harbin, China 7 February 2025 – 14 February 2025
- Competitors: 18 in 1 sport
- Flag bearers: Sameh Hegazi & Malak Janahi
- Medals: Gold 0 Silver 0 Bronze 0 Total 0

Asian Winter Games appearances
- 2011; 2017; 2025; 2029

Bahrain competed at the 2025 Asian Winter Games in Harbin, China, from February 7 to 14. Bahrain returns to the Asian Winter Games after withdrawing from the last edition in 2017. The Bahraini team consisted of 18 athletes competing in ice hockey. Ice hockey player Sameh Hegazi and official Malak Janahi were the country's opening ceremony flagbearers.

== Competitors ==
The following table lists the Bahraini delegation per sport and gender.

Sport	Men	Women	Total
Ice hockey	18	0	18
Total	18	0	18

== Ice hockey ==
=== Men's tournament ===
Bahrain qualified a men's hockey team. The Bahraini team originally did not qualify for the event. However, the final schedule listed the team as one of 14 competing. The Bahrain team finished the competition in last place.

Bahrain was represented by the following 18 athletes:

- Abdulla Aladhab (G)
- Mohamed Alatwi (F)
- Rashed Albahri (F)
- Majeed Ali Ali (F)
- Abdulla Al Marzooqi
- Abdulla Al Mutawa (D)
- Rashed Al Mutlaq (G)
- Yousif Al Salah (F)
- Salman Al Thawadi (F)
- Sameh Hegazi (F)
- Abdullatif Hejres (F)
- Ammar Husain (D)
- Abdulla Janahi (F)
- Ahmed Masaud (F)
- Abdulla Sayer (D)
- Salman Sulaibeekh (D)
- Abdulla Turki (D)
- Abdulrahman Turki (D)

Legend: G = Goalie, D = Defense, F = Forward

Group stage

Pos	Team	Pld	W	OW	OL	L	GF	GA	GD	Pts	Qualification
1	Kyrgyzstan	3	2	1	0	0	49	10	+39	8	Quarterfinals
2	Kuwait	3	2	0	1	0	52	12	+40	7	Placement 9–10
3	Singapore	3	1	0	0	2	25	22	+3	3	Placement 11–12
4	Bahrain	3	0	0	0	3	1	83	−82	0	Placement 13–14

Source: OCA

3 February; 13:00	Singapore	20–1 (12–0, 5–0, 3–1)	Bahrain	Harbin Ice Hockey Arena, Harbin; Attendance: 2,517

Game reference

Joshua Lee
Lee Chin Hao
Goalies
Abdulla Al-Adhab
Referee:
Faris Hakimin Yusoff (MAS)

B. Lee (Kodrowski, Chua) – 00:50	1–0
Chan (Blakney) – 01:14	2–0
Chew (Kodrowski, Chua) – 05:09	3–0
Blakney (Goh, O'Brien) – 07:38	4–0
B. Lee (O'Brien) – 09:03	5–0
Chan (SH) – 09:41	6–0
Qian (Chan, Tan) (PP) – 12:16	7–0
Lim (Wintland) – 12:57	8–0
Gunawardena (Kok) – 13:23	9–0
Chan (O'Brien, Kodrowski) – 14:17	10–0
Wintland (Lee S., Tan) – 16:22	11–0
Lee S. (Wintland) – 16:57	12–0
Lee S. (Wintland, Chew) – 27:27	13–0
Goh (Chew) (SH) – 29:40	14–0
Gunawardena (B. Lee, Kodrowski) – 32:04	15–0
Kok (Lim, Chua) – 32:29	16–0
Chan (Blakney) – 37:02	17–0
Gunawardena (Goh, Chan) – 43:05	18–0
Lim (Lee S.) – 50:38	19–0
	19–1	53:02 – Al-Bahri
Chua (Lim, Chew) – 55:08	20–1

8 min
Penalties
6 min
59
Shots
8

5 February; 13:00	Kyrgyzstan	29–0 (10–0, 10–0, 9–0)	Bahrain	Harbin Sport University Stadium, Harbin; Attendance: 398

Game reference

Artem Vasilev
Goalies
Abdulla Al-Adhab
Rashed Al-Mutlaq
Referee:
Anton Boryayev (KAZ)

Bekmuratov (Mirbekov, Popov) (PP) – 04:03	1–0
Leshchenko (Supokhunov, Nuraliev) – 09:11	2–0
Titov (Egorov, Seifulov) – 09:56	3–0
Mirbekov (Popov, Bekmuratov) – 11:02	4–0
Abdyraev (Titov, Nuraliev) – 12:46	5–0
Mirbekov – 15:17	6–0
Supokhunov – 16:27	7–0
Titov (Abdyraev, Terentyev) – 16:40	8–0
Ismanov (Bekmuratov) – 18:37	9–0
Abdyraev (Titov, Egorov) – 19:25	10–0
Egorov (Abdyraev, Seifulov) – 20:25	11–0
Nuraliev (Bem, Leshchenko) – 25:34	12–0
Seifulov (Titov, Egorov) – 25:54	13–0
Titov (Seifulov, Abdyraev) – 29:28	14–0
Titov (Abdyraev, Seifulov) – 30:10	15–0
Ismanov – 33:42	16–0
Popov (Mirbekov) – 33:55	17–0
Maksatbekov (Supokhunov, Nuraliev) – 34:25	18–0
Egorov (Seifulov, Titov) – 36:38	19–0
Popov (Ismanov, Mirbekov) (SH) – 39:41	20–0
Mirbekov (Kachkynbekov, Popov) (SH) – 40:38	21–0
Kachkynbekov (Ismanov) – 44:37	22–0
Bem (Nuraliev, Supokhunov) – 46:02	23–0
Seifulov (Abdyraev) – 46:58	24–0
Popov (Ismanov, Mirbekov) – 50:44	25–0
Ismanov (Mirbekov, Bekmuratov) – 50:54	26–0
Popov (Mirbekov, Ismanov) – 53:41	27–0
Kachkynbekov (Mirbekov, Bekmuratov) – 54:34	28–0
Seifulov – 57:00	29–0

7 min
Penalties
2 min
102
Shots
3

9 February; 21:00	Bahrain	0–34 (0–10, 0–10, 0–14)	Kuwait	Harbin Ice Hockey Arena, Harbin; Attendance: 907

Game reference

Rashed Al-Mutlaq
Abdulla Al-Adhab
Goalies
Adam Barvík
Zaid Al-Saied
Referee:
Li Ho Ching (HKG)

0–1	01:38 – Al-Khashan (Al-Ajmi, Al-Foudari)
0–2	03:52 – Drozdetskikh (Tsibin)
0–3	04:20 – Tsibin (Budzevich, Drozdetskikh)
0–4	06:18 – Al-Khalaf (Al-Khashan, Al-Foudari)
0–5	08:26 – Vavra (Al-Awadhi, Abdula. Al-Maragi)
0–6	10:32 – Tsibin (Al-Foudari)
0–7	13:35 – Al-Mari (Al-Khalaf, Tsibin) (PP)
0–8	14:05 – Vavra (Zidarević)
0–9	17:00 – Abdull. Al-Maragi (Vavra, Al-Duaij)
0–10	17:56 – Drozdetskikh (Tsibin, Budzevich)
0–11	21:37 – Vavra (Al-Daei)
0–12	21:56 – Al-Khashan (Al-Khashram)
0–13	26:21 – Zidarević (Vavra, Al-Awadhi)
0–14	28:36 – Al-Khashram (Tsibin) (SH)
0–15	29:46 – Tsibin (Budzevich)
0–16	30:05 – Budzevich (Drozdetskikh)
0–17	35:05 – Drozdetskikh
0–18	35:56 – Vavra (Al-Awadhi, Zidarević)
0–19	36:56 – Al-Ajmi (Al-Khashram, Al-Foudari)
0–20	39:06 – Drozdetskikh (Budzevich, Al-Khalaf)
0–21	40:35 – Budzevich (Drozdetskikh, Tsibin)
0–22	41:13 – Al-Daei (Vavra, Al-Awadhi) (PP)
0–23	42:15 – Tsibin
0–24	45:31 – Tsibin (Budzevich, Drozdetskikh)
0–25	46:19 – Vavra (Zidarević, Al-Awadhi)
0–26	50:00 – Budzevich (Tsibin, Drozdetskikh)
0–27	50:24 – Zidarević (Vavra, Al-Awadhi)
0–28	55:36 – Tsibin (Budzevich) (SH)
0–29	56:24 – Zidarević (Vavra)
0–30	57:57 – Al-Asousi (Vavra, Abdull. Al-Maragi)
0–31	58:29 – Tsibin (Budzevich, Drozdetskikh)
0–32	58:48 – Al-Mari (Tsibin, Drozdetskikh)
0–33	59:23 – Vavra (Al-Awadhi)
0–34	59:33 – Al-Awadhi (Vavra)

8 min
Penalties
6 min
9
Shots
86

Thirteenth place game

10 February; 9:00	Macau	4–3 OT (0–1, 1–1, 2–1) (OT: 1–0)	Bahrain	Harbin Sport University Stadium, Harbin; Attendance: 507

Game reference

Leung Manlong
Goalies
Abdulla Al-Adhab
Referee:
Timur Morev (KAZ)

	0–1	18:11 – Hegazi (Al-Bahri, Masaud) (PP)
Shinoda (Sou) – 32:33	1–1
	1–2	33:16 – Masaud (Al-Salah, Hegazi)
	1–3	41:59 – Al-Mutawa (Masaud)
Sou (Hong, Shinoda) (PP) – 45:31	2–3
Yeung (Kong) – 52:52	3–3
Cheng (Wong, Leong) – 63:17	4–3

10 min
Penalties
14 min
43
Shots
21
