= Humo Tashkent =

Uzbek ice hockey team

- City: Tashkent, Uzbekistan
- League: Uzbekistan Ice Hockey Championship
- Founded: 2018
- Home arena: Humo Arena
- Colours: Blue, Orange
- Head coach: Dmitri Katayev
- Captain: Vacant

Hockey Club Humo, (Uzbek: Ҳумо Хоккей Клуби; Russian: Хоккейный клуб Хумо) commonly referred to as Humo Tashkent, is a professional ice hockey team based in Tashkent, Uzbekistan. Originally a member of the Uzbekistan Ice Hockey League, Humo joined the Pro Hokei Ligasy for the 2022–23 Season. Humo played their games at the Humo Arena. both the team and arena derive their names from the mythical Huma bird, a symbol of happiness and freedom. They formerly play in the Supreme Hockey League from 2019 to 2020.

== History ==
Humo Tashkent was a member of the reformed Uzbekistan Ice Hockey League which began play in February 2019. The UIHL consisted of three other teams Binokor Tashkent, HK Tashkent, & Semurg Tashkent, with all of the teams playing out of the Humo Ice Dome. Humo would finish in first place at the end of the regular season, with Forward Pavel Sedov scoring the most points throughout the season. In the play-offs however, Humo were upset by the 4th seeded Semurg Tashkent. Semurg would then go on to defeat Binokor in the final.

On 31 May 2019 it was announced that Humo would be joining the VHL for the 2019–20 season. Alongside Humo, Dynamo Tver, Torpedo-Gorky Nizhny Novgorod and Kazakhstan's Nomad Astana would also be joining the league. Rumours of an Uzbek team in the VHL had been circulating for months, after KHL Vice-President Vitali Prokhorov announced that an Uzbek team could join the KHL in 2022, after having gained experience in the VHL. It was subsequently announced that a further two teams would be joining the VHL; HK Rostov and China's Shougang Beijing.

A Humo farm team playing in the Kazakhstan Hockey Championship was also proposed. Initially, Binokor Tashkent was earmarked for this role, however on July 17, 2019, the Kazakhstan Ice Hockey Federation announced that a new team from Samarkand, HC Sherdor, would be taking Binokor's place in the league. A week later it was announced that the Samarkand rink would not be completed in time, and as a result 'Humo Tashkent 2' would act as the feeder club for the VHL side.

Following the completion of the 2019-20 VHL Season, and the cancellation of the playoffs as a result of the COVID-19 pandemic Humo announced that they would not be fielding a team in either the VHL or the Kazakhstan Hockey Championship, citing "the absence of an unambiguous understanding of the timing of the start of pre-season preparation and the VHL itself, as well as the format in which it will be held" due to the ongoing pandemic.

In 2025, they announced they were withdrawing and not participating from the Kazakhstan Hockey Championship due to financial difficulties and funding problems. In November 2025, the team joined the Uzbekistan Open Championship, consisting of teams from Uzbekistan and Kyrgyzstan.

== Current roster ==
As of 17 February 2025.

| No. | Nat | Player | Pos | S/G | Age | Acquired | Birthplace |
|---|---|---|---|---|---|---|---|
| 24 | (Russia) | Egor Arbuzov | D | L | 24 | 2024 | Moscow, Russia |
| 77 | (Belarus) | Anton Astashevich | F | R | 21 | 2024 | Minsk, Belarus |
| 23 | (Kazakhstan) | Stanislav Borovikov | D | L | 37 | 2024 | Ust-Kamenogorsk, Kazakh SSR, Soviet Union |
| 73 | (Belarus) | Yegor Buyalsky | RW | R | 24 | 2024 | Minsk, Belarus |
| 33 | (Russia) | Alexander Derbenyov | F | L | 27 | 2024 | Yekaterinburg, Russia |
| 70 | (Russia) | Vladislav Dyukarev | C | R | 29 | 2024 | Orsk, Russia |
| 19 | (Russia) | Radel Fazleyev | C | L | 30 | 2024 | Kazan, Russia |
| 92 | (Kazakhstan) | Dmitri Grents | C | R | 29 | 2024 | Ust-Kamenogorsk, Kazakhstan |
| 13 | (Russia) | Artyom Gryaznov | F | R | 20 | 2024 | Krasnodar, Russia |
| 18 | (Belarus) | Danila Karaban | C | R | 29 | 2024 | Novopolotsk, Belarus |
| 31 | (Russia) | Nikita Klimakhin | G | L | 19 | 2024 | Saran, Kazakhstan |
| 74 | (Belarus) | Konstantin Kozlovsky | G | L | 30 | 2024 | Mogilev, Belarus |
| 7 | (Russia) | Vadim Kravchenko | LW | R | 32 | 2022 | Omsk, Russia |
| 8 | (Belarus) | Artur Kuznetsov | F | L | 20 | 2024 | Zhlobin, Belarus |
| 17 | (Kazakhstan) | Artyom Likhotnikov | RW | L | 31 | 2024 | Temirtau, Kazakhstan |
| 51 | (Russia) | Vyacheslav Litovchenko | C | L | 36 | 2024 | Khabarovsk, Russian SFSR, Soviet Union |
| 10 | (Russia) | Denis Ludtsev | RW | R | 28 | 2024 | Barnaul, Russia |
| 27 | (Russia) | Artyom Maltsev | D | R | 27 | 2023 | Saint Petersburg, Russia |
| 89 | (Sweden) | Mark-Emil Malyshev | D | L | 24 | 2024 | Uppsala, Sweden |
| 35 | (Russia) | Gleb Moiseyev | G | L | 24 | 2024 | Magnitogorsk, Russia |
| 15 | (Belarus) | Andrei Pavlenko | RW | L | 25 | 2024 | Minsk, Belarus |
| 66 | (Uzbekistan) | Zhavokhir Rasulov | F | R | 26 | 2022 | Samara, Russia |
| 86 | (Belarus) | Dmitry Savritsky | D | L | 26 | 2024 | Minsk, Belarus |
| 3 | (Latvia) | Edgars Siksna | D | R | 33 | 2024 | Riga, Latvia |
| 88 | (Kazakhstan) | Ivan Stepanenko | D | L | 30 | 2024 | Karaganda, Kazakhstan |
| 26 | (Russia) | Alexander Shevchenko | D | L | 28 | 2024 | Novokuznetsk, Russia |
| 72 | (Russia) | Yegor Shpak | G | L | 19 | 2024 | Saint Petersburg, Russia |
| 55 | (Russia) | Yegor Zebzeyev | D | L | 22 | 2024 | Perm, Russia |
| 87 | (Russia) | Vasily Zhilov | F | L | 31 | 2023 | Ufa, Russia |

== Season-by-season record ==
Note: GP = Games played, W = Wins, L = Losses, T = Ties, OTL = Overtime losses, Pts = Points, GF = Goals for, GA = Goals against, PIM = Penalties in minutes

| Season | League | GP | W | L | T | OTW | OTL | Pts | GF | GA | Finish | Playoffs |
| 2019-20 | VHL | 54 | 26 | 19 | — | 2 | 7 | 63 | 138 | 133 | 15th | Playoffs cancelled |
