= Ice hockey at the 2025 Asian Winter Games =

Ice hockey competitions at the 2025 Asian Winter Games

- Venue: Harbin Ice Hockey Arena; Harbin Sport University Stadium
- Dates: 3–14 February 2025
- Competitors: 450 from 14 nations

Ice hockey competitions at the 2025 Asian Winter Games in Harbin, Heilongjiang, China, were held at the Harbin Ice Hockey Arena and the Harbin Sport University between 4–14 February.

A total of 14 men's and 7 women's teams from 14 NOC's contested the two tournaments.

== Schedule ==
P	Preliminary round	●	Final round	●	Last round	¼	Quarterfinals	½	Semifinals	F	Finals

Event↓/Date →	3rd Mon	4th Tue	5th Wed	6th Thu	7th Fri	8th Sat	9th Sun	10th Mon	11th Tue	12th Wed	13th Thu	14th Fri
Men	P	P	P	P	P	P	P	P	¼		½	F
Women	P	P		P		P	P			●	●	●

== Medalists ==
Event	Gold	Silver	Bronze
Men	Kazakhstan; Jelaladdin Amirbekov; Dmitriy Breus; Tamirlan Gaitamirov; Andrey Buyalskiy; Samat Daniyar; Ruslan Ospanov; Danil Butenko; Alikhan Omirbekov; Artyom Korolyov; Alexandr Borissevich; Roman Starchenko; Yevgeniy Rymarev; Dmitriy Grents; Andrey Shutov; Vyacheslav Kolesnikov; Kirill Panyukov; Denis Chaporov; Kirill Savitskiy; Ivan Stepanenko; Eduard Mikhailov; Artyom Likhotnikov; Adil Beketayev; Maxim Pavlenko	Japan; Yuta Narisawa; Seiya Hayata; Koki Yoneyama; Jiei Halliday; Kotaro Yamada; Kotaro Tsutsumi; Riku Ishida; Kenta Takagi; Toi Kobayashi; Kosuke Otsu; Hiroto Sato; Masato Okubo; Yuto Osawa; Taiga Irikura; Shigeki Hitosato; Makuru Furuhashi; Shogo Nakajima; Yusei Otsu; Kento Suzuki; Sota Isogai; Kazuki Lawlor; Issa Otsuka; Eiki Sato	South Korea; Lee Seung-jae; Kim Won-jun; Oh In-gyo; Kim Sang-yeob; Kim Si-hwan; Kong Yu-chan; Kim Sang-wook; Lee Min-jae; Kim Dong-hwan; Ahn Jin-hui; Ha Jung-ho; Lee Yeon-seung; Jeon Jung-woo; Nam Hee-doo; Lim Dong-kyu; Kwon Hyeon-su; Kim Geon-woo; Lee Chong-min; Lee Hyun-seung; Lee Moo-young; Kang Min-wan; Kang Yoon-seok
Women	Japan; Riko Kawaguchi; Shiori Koike; Aoi Shiga; Shiori Yamashita; Kohane Sato; Kanami Seki; Akane Hosoyamada; Hikaru Yamashita; Rui Ukita; Yoshino Enomoto; Wakana Kurosu; Suzuka Maeda; Makoto Ito; Haruka Kuromaru; Remi Koyama; Rio Noro; Mei Miura; Riri Noro; Yumeka Wajima; Ai Tada; Miyuu Masuhara	Kazakhstan; Zlatotsveta Feoktistova; Alexandra Voronova; Munira Sayakhatkyzy; Katrin Meskini; Malika Aldabergenova; Pernesh Ashimova; Nadezhda Filimonova; Dariya Moldabay; Alexandra Shegay; Polina Yakovleva; Dilnaz Sayakhatkyzy; Madina Tursynova; Larissa Sviridova; Anna Pyatkova; Aida Olzhabayeva; Anastassiya Orazbayeva; Alina Ivanchenko; Arina Chshyokolova; Yuliya Butorina; Sofiya Zubkova; Tatyana Koroleva; Yekaterina Kutsenko; Polina Govtva	China; Yu Baiwei; Zhang Mengying; Kong Minghui; Wu Sijia; Zhao Qinan; Hu Jiayi; Qu Yue; Du Sijia; Liu Siyang; Fang Xin; Wang Jiaxin; Liu Chunshuang; Guan Yingying; Yang Jinglei; Wang Yuqing; Zhang Biyang; Li Yiming; Lai Guimin; Gao Ziye; Li Qianhua; Zhao Ziyu; Wen Lu; Zhu Rui

== Medal table ==
Rank	Nation	Gold	Silver	Bronze	Total
1	Japan (JPN)	1	1	0	2
1	Kazakhstan (KAZ)	1	1	0	2
3	China (CHN)	0	0	1	1
3	South Korea (KOR)	0	0	1	1
Totals (4 entries)		2	2	2	6

== Qualification ==
=== Men ===
The top 12 ranked NOC's in the IIHF World Ranking in May 2024 qualified for the men's tournament but the United Arab Emirates (ranked 36th) withdrew. The Olympic Council of Asia changed the format and added three unranked teams to make it a 14-team competition. The top six ranked teams were placed in Group A and the rest were drawn in other two groups using the serpentine system.

Group A

- Kazakhstan (15)
- South Korea (22)
- Japan (24)
- China (26)
- Chinese Taipei (40)
- Thailand (43)

Group B

- Kyrgyzstan (45)
- Singapore (51)
- Kuwait (52)
- Bahrain

Group C

- Turkmenistan (46)
- Hong Kong (49)
- Macau
- India

=== Women ===
The top 8 ranked NOC's in the IIHF World Ranking in May 2024 qualified for the women's tournament with North Korea withdrawing. The top two ranked teams were given byes to the final round, the five other teams played a round robin.

- Japan (7)
- China (12)
- South Korea (18)
- Kazakhstan (23)
- Chinese Taipei (26)
- Hong Kong (30)
- ~~North Korea (42)~~
- Thailand (45)

== Final standing ==
=== Men ===
Rank	Team	Pld	W	OW	OL	L
1st place, gold medalist(s)	Kazakhstan	8	8	0	0	0
2nd place, silver medalist(s)	Japan	8	4	1	0	3
3rd place, bronze medalist(s)	South Korea	8	5	1	1	1
4	China	8	3	0	1	4
5	Chinese Taipei	6	1	0	0	5
6	Thailand	6	0	0	0	6
7	Kyrgyzstan	5	2	2	0	1
8	Hong Kong	5	3	0	1	1
9	Kuwait	4	3	0	1	0
10	Turkmenistan	4	2	0	0	2
11	Singapore	4	2	0	0	2
12	India	4	1	0	0	3
13	Macau	4	0	1	0	3
14	Bahrain	4	0	0	1	3

=== Women ===
Rank	Team	Pld	W	OW	OL	L
1st place, gold medalist(s)	Japan	3	3	0	0	0
2nd place, silver medalist(s)	Kazakhstan	7	5	1	0	1
3rd place, bronze medalist(s)	China	3	1	0	0	2
4	South Korea	7	3	0	1	3
5	Chinese Taipei	4	2	0	0	2
6	Thailand	4	1	0	0	3
7	Hong Kong	4	0	0	0	4
