= Panyukov =

Panyukov is a Russian surname. Notable people with the surname include:

- Andrei Panyukov (born 1994), Russian footballer
- Kirill Panyukov (born 1997), Kazakhstani footballer
