= Chinese Taipei Ice Hockey League =

Taiwanese ice hockey team

Chinese Taipei Ice Hockey League (CIHL; Chinese: 中華冰球聯盟) is a Taiwanese highest ice hockey league based out of Taipei. Founded in 2004, it is run by the Chinese Taipei Ice Hockey Federation. The league is divided into two divisions (The Open Division for local players, and The International Division for foreigners living in Taiwan). The league plays their games every weekend out of the Taipei Arena.

The International Division also assembles an all-star team, the Taiwan Typhoon, to play in various tournaments around Asia each year.

== International Division ==
The International Division has nine teams with most players on the teams being foreigners, Canadians being the dominant nationality represented. The teams in the International Division as of the 2008 season were Rhinos, Bears, Tigers, Wolves, Sharks, Lions, Raptors, Dragons and Mustangs.

== The Open Division ==
The Open Division is more geared towards Taiwanese players, just learning or being relatively new to the game of hockey.

== Results ==
=== International Division ===
Season	Champion	Runner-up	3rd place	4th place
2009-10	Bears	Tigers		
2008-09	Raptors	Wolves		
2007-08	Sharks	Lions	Tigers	Wolves
2006-07	Bears	Tigers	Lions	Sharks
2005	Sharks	Bears	Raptors	Tigers
2004	Raptors	Bears	Rhinos	Tigers

=== Open division ===
Season	Champion	Runner-up	3rd-place	4th-place
2006-07	Dragons	Hornets	Killer Whales	Leopards
2006	Leopards	Hawks	Killer Whales	Dragons
2004	Hawks	Lions	Leopards	Elephants
