= Chinese Taipei Ice Hockey Federation =

Ice hockey governing body of Taiwan

Chinese Taipei
- Association name: Chinese Taipei Ice Hockey Federation
- IIHF Code: TPE
- IIHF membership: September 1, 1983
- President: Hsieh Chun-Huang
- IIHF men's ranking: 38th (May 2025)
- IIHF women's ranking: 25th (April 21, 2025)

Chinese Taipei Ice Hockey Federation
- Traditional Chinese: 中華民國冰球協會
- Simplified Chinese: 中华民国冰球协会
Transcriptions
Standard Mandarin
- Hanyu Pinyin: Zhōnghuá Mínguó Bīngqiú Xiéhuì

The Chinese Taipei Ice Hockey Federation (CTIHF) is the governing body of ice hockey in the Republic of China (Taiwan).

== National teams ==
- Men
- Men U20
- Men U18
- Women

=== Participation by year ===
2017

Event	Division	Host nation	Date	Result
Men	Div. III	Bulgaria	10–16 April 2017	6th place (46th overall)
Men U20	Div. III	New Zealand	16–22 January 2017	7th place (41st overall)
Men U18	Div. IIIA	Chinese Taipei	21–27 March 2017	3rd place (37th overall)
Women	Div. IIBQ	Chinese Taipei	12–17 December 2016	1st place (33rd overall)
Asian WG		Japan	18–26 February 2017	6th place (2nd in Division I)

2018

Event	Division	Host nation	Date	Result
Men	Div. III	South Africa	16–22 April 2018	6th place (44th overall)
Men U20	Div. IIIQ	South Africa	5–7 February 2018	2nd place (42nd overall)
Men U18	Div. IIIA	Turkey	26–28 April 2018	6th place (40th overall)
Women	Div. IIB	Spain	17–23 March 2018	2nd place (29th overall)

== Leagues ==
- Chinese Taipei Ice Hockey League
