= Kim Won-jun (ice hockey) =

South Korean ice hockey player

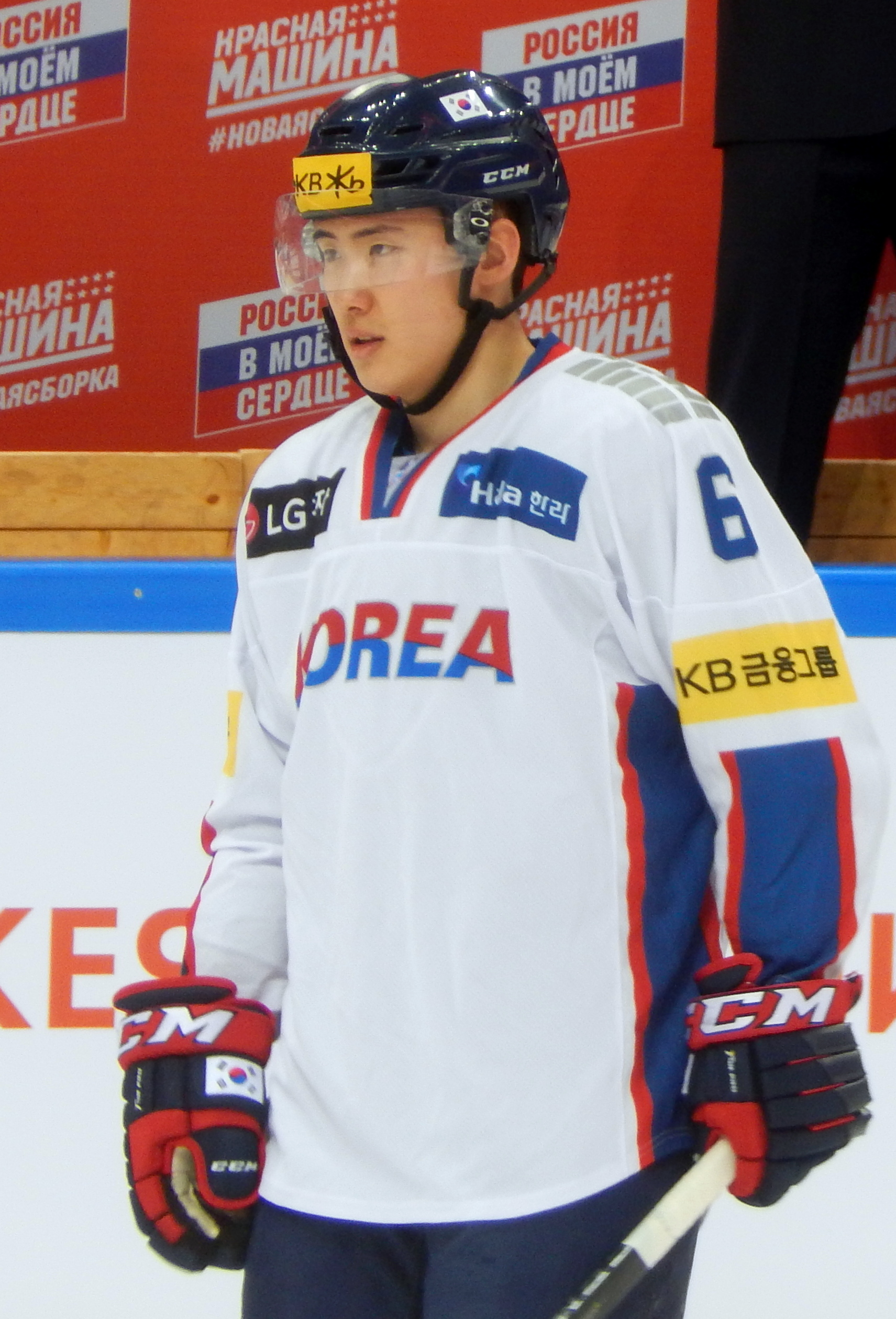
- #6 KIM, Won Jun during Channel One Cup 2017, match Canada - South Korea (December 13, 2017)
- Born: 4 May 1991 (age 34); Seoul, South Korea
- Height: 178 cm (5 ft 10 in)
- Weight: 81 kg (179 lb; 12 st 11 lb)
- Position: Defenceman
- Shoots: Right
- ALIH team: Anyang Halla
- National team: South Korea
- Playing career: 2013–present

Medal record

Ice hockey

Representing South Korea

Asian Winter Games
Bronze medal – third place	2025 Harbin	Ice hockey

Kim Won-jun (born 4 May 1991) is a South Korean ice hockey defenceman currently playing for Anyang Halla of Asia League Ice Hockey. He competed at the 2018 Winter Olympics.
