= Evgeni Rymarev =

Kazakhstani ice hockey player

- Born: September 9, 1988 (age 37) Ust-Kamenogorsk, Kazakh SSR, Soviet Union
- Height: 5 ft 9 in (175 cm)
- Weight: 172 lb (78 kg; 12 st 4 lb)
- Position: Right winger
- Shoots: Left
- team Former teams: Free agent HC Astana; Barys Astana
- National team: Kazakhstan
- NHL draft: Undrafted
- Playing career: 2007–present

Medal record

Men's ice hockey

Representing Kazakhstan

Asian Winter Games
Gold medal – first place	2011 Astana-Almaty	Ice hockey
Gold medal – first place	2025 Harbin	Ice hockey

Evgeni Vladimirovich Rymarev (Russian: Евге́ний Влади́мирович Ры́марев; born September 9, 1988) is a Kazakhstani professional ice hockey winger. He previously has played with Barys Astana of the Kontinental Hockey League (KHL).

== Career statistics ==
=== International ===
Year	Team	Event	Result	GP	G	A	Pts	PIM
2005	Kazakhstan	U18-I	13th	5	1	2	3	2
2006	Kazakhstan	U18-I	13th	5	7	2	9	4
2007	Kazakhstan	WJC-I	13th	5	3	2	5	0
2008	Kazakhstan	WJC-I	12th	6	6	1	7	0
2008	Kazakhstan	OGQ	DNQ	6	1	4	5	6
2009	Kazakhstan	WC-I	P	5	5	2	7	6
2010	Kazakhstan	WC	16th	6	0	0	0	0
2011	Kazakhstan	AWG	1st place, gold medalist(s)	3	4	6	10	0
2012	Kazakhstan	WC	16th	7	1	0	1	2
2014	Kazakhstan	WC	16th	5	3	1	4	0
2015	Kazakhstan	WC-I	P	5	3	3	6	0
2016	Kazakhstan	WC	16th	7	1	3	4	0
2016	Kazakhstan	OGQ	DNQ	3	0	2	2	0
2018	Kazakhstan	WC-I	13th	5	2	4	6	2
2019	Kazakhstan	WC-I	P	5	1	2	3	0
2020	Kazakhstan	OGQ	DNQ	3	1	1	2	0
2021	Kazakhstan	WC	10th	6	1	0	1	0
2023	Kazakhstan	WC	11th	7	2	4	6	2
2024	Kazakhstan	WC	12th	7	0	3	3	2
2024	Kazakhstan	OGQ	DNQ	3	0	0	0	0
2025	Kazakhstan	AWG	1st place, gold medalist(s)	8	7	11	18	0
2025	Kazakhstan	WC	15th	3	0	0	0	0
Junior totals				21	17	7	24	6
Senior totals				94	32	46	78	20
