= Jeon Jung-woo =

South Korean ice hockey player

- Born: 27 May 1994 (age 31); South Korea
- Height: 175 cm (5 ft 9 in)
- Weight: 75 kg (165 lb; 11 st 11 lb)
- Position: Forward
- Shoots: Left
- Korea team Former teams: Sangmu; Daemyung Killer Whales
- National team: South Korea
- Playing career: 2016–present

Medal record

Ice hockey

Representing South Korea

Asian Winter Games
Bronze medal – third place	2025 Harbin	Ice hockey

Jeon Jung-woo (born 27 May 1994) is a South Korean ice hockey player. He competed in the 2018 Winter Olympics.
