= Maxim Pavlenko =

Kazakh ice hockey player (born 2002)

- Born: 4 June 2002 (age 24) Aksu, Kazakhstan
- Height: 6 ft 5 in (196 cm)
- Weight: 205 lb (93 kg; 14 st 9 lb)
- Position: Goaltender
- Catches: Left
- VHL team Former teams: Khimik Voskresensk; HC Ryazan; Nomad Astana; Snezhnye Barsy; WBS Penguins
- National team: Kazakhstan
- NHL draft: Undrafted
- Playing career: 2022–present

Maxim Pavlenko (Russian: Максим Павленко; born 4 June 2002) is a Kazakh professional ice hockey goaltender currently playing for Khimik Voskresensk of the All-Russian Hockey League (VHL).

== Playing career ==
As a youth, Pavlenko played for Snezhnye Barsy, the youth affiliate of the KHL's Barys Astana. In 2019, he was named the best goaltender in the first-ever Kazakhstan Youth Cup. Pavlenko won the Kazakhstan Hockey Cup by winning the Pro Hokei Ligasy with Nomad Astana for the 2022–23 season. The team went on the represent Kazakhstan in the 2023–24 IIHF Continental Cup, eventually winning the competition. He then spent two seasons with HC Ryazan of the Russian VHL. In total, he appeared in thirty-two games for the team, posting a 9–16–1 record, a 2.44 GAA, a .919 SV%, and two shutouts.

In June 2025, it was announced that Pavlenko had joined the Wilkes-Barre/Scranton Penguins on a 1-year American Hockey League contract for the 2025–26 season. He signed the contract on his twenty-third birthday. With the signing, he became just the ninth-ever Kazakh player to sign for an AHL club and the first in fifteen years. Pavlenko won his debut for the club, a 2–1 pre-season shootout victory over the Hershey Bears on 3 October. He stopped seventeen of eighteen shots he faced in the game and all three shots in the shootout.

Later in October 2025, Pavlenko was assigned to the Pittsburgh Penguins' ECHL affiliate, the Wheeling Nailers. He was the team's starting goaltender against the Cincinnati Cyclones to open the 2025–26 season. He made twenty-seven saves on thirty shots to win his full North American debut 5–3.

On 5 November 2025, Pavlenko was recalled to the Baby Pens after regular starter Sergei Murashov was called up to the Pittsburgh Penguins. He made his AHL debut two days later in relief of Filip Larsson, stopping sixteen of seventeen shots in two periods against the Rochester Americans, ultimately being credited with the loss. On 9 November, Pavlenko earned his first AHL start, win, and shutout, defeating the Utica Comets 4–0 at home.

== International career ==
Pavlenko was part of Kazakhstan's squad at the 2023 IIHF World Championship but did not see any icetime. In February 2025, he was part of nation's team that won the gold medal at the 2025 Asian Winter Games. In the absence of regular starters Nikita Boyarkin and Andrei Shutov, he was named the country's starting goaltender for the 2025 IIHF World Championship. In the team's opening match, Pavlenko's senior debut, he saved thirty of thirty-one shots in a 2–1 victory over Norway. He was named Kazakhstan's Man of the Match for his performance.

== Career statistics ==
=== Regular season and playoffs ===
Bold indicates led league

			Regular season									Playoffs
Season	Team	League	GP	W	L	OTL	MIN	GA	SO	GAA	SV%	GP	W	L	MIN	GA	SO	GAA	SV%
2019–20	Snezhnye Barsy	MHL	24	1	15	3	1095	84	0	4.64	.856	0	0	0	0	0	0	0	0
2020–21	Snezhnye Barsy	Pro Hokei Ligasy	31	3	28	0	1537	107	1	4.18	.893	0	0	0	0	0	0	0	0
2021–22	Snezhnye Barsy	Pro Hokei Ligasy	40	8	32	0	1943	121	2	3.74	.896	0	0	0	0	0	0	0	0
2022–23	Snezhnye Barsy	Pro Hokei Ligasy	4	1	3	0	193	10	0	3.13	.925	0	0	0	0	0	0	0	0
2022–23	Nomad Astana	Pro Hokei Ligasy	10	8	2	0	385	11	1	1.72	.939	1	0	1	0	0	0	0.00	1.000
2023–24	HC Ryazan	VHL	25	7	13	1	1330	52	1	2.35	.923	0	0	0	0	0	0	0	0
2024–25	HC Ryazan	VHL	7	2	3	0	320	15	1	2.81	.901	0	0	0	0	0	0	0	0
2025–26	Wheeling Nailers	ECHL	26	15	9	0	1417	63	4	2.67	.903	0	0	0	0	0	0	0	0
2025–26	Wilkes-Barre/Scranton Penguins	AHL	4	3	1	0	222	8	1	2.16	.912	0	0	0	0	0	0	0	0
MHL totals			24	1	15	3	1095	84	0	4.64	.856	0	0	0	0	0	0	0	0
Pro Hokei Ligasy totals			85	20	15	65	4058	249	4	3.68	.900	1	0	1	0	0	0	0.00	1.000
VHL totals			32	9	16	1	1650	67	2	2.44	.919	0	0	0	0	0	0	0	0
ECHL totals			26	15	9	0	1417	63	4	2.67	.903	0	0	0	0	0	0	0	0
AHL totals			4	3	1	0	222	8	1	2.16	.912	0	0	0	0	0	0	0	0

=== International ===
Year	Team	Event	Result	GP	W	L	T	MIN	GA	SO	GAA	SV%
2021	Kazakhstan	WJC-I	4th	4	2	2	0	218	10	0	2.76	.905
2025	Kazakhstan	AWG	1st place, gold medalist(s)	2	1	0	0	60	0	0	0.00	1.00
2025	Kazakhstan	WC	15th	7	1	4	0	336	21	0	3.75	.881
Junior totals				4	2	2	0	218	10	0	2.76	.905
Senior totals				9	2	4	0	396	21	0	-	-
