= Andrei Shutov (ice hockey) =

Kazakhstani ice hockey player (born 1998)

- Born: 4 March 1998 (age 27) Oskemen, Kazakhstan
- Height: 1.88 m (6 ft 2 in)
- Weight: 83 kg (183 lb; 13 st 1 lb)
- Position: Goaltender
- Catches: Left
- KHL team Former teams: Barys Astana; Kazzinc-Torpedo; HC Slovan Bratislava
- National team: Kazakhstan
- Playing career: 2016–present

Medal record

Ice hockey

Representing Kazakhstan

Asian Winter Games
Gold medal – first place	2025 Harbin	Ice hockey

Andrei Alekseevich Shutov (Russian: Андрей Алексеевич Шутов; born 4 March 1998) is a Kazakhstani ice hockey player for Barys Astana in the Kontinental Hockey League (KHL) and the Kazakhstani national team.

He represented Kazakhstan at the 2021, 2022, 2023, and 2024 IIHF World Championships.
