= Dmitri Grents =

Kazakhstani ice hockey player

- Born: 10 June 1996 (age 30) Oskemen, Kazakhstan
- Height: 6 ft 1 in (185 cm)
- Weight: 187 lb (85 kg; 13 st 5 lb)
- Position: Centre
- Shoots: Right
- PHL team Former teams: Humo Tashkent; Barys Astana
- National team: Kazakhstan
- Playing career: 2015–present

Medal record

Ice hockey

Representing Kazakhstan

Asian Winter Games
Gold medal – first place	2025 Harbin	Ice hockey

Dmitri Igorevich Grents (Kazakh: Дмитрий Игоревич Гренц; born 10 June 1996) is a Kazakhstani ice hockey centre for Humo Tashkent in the Pro Hokei Ligasy. He formerly played for Barys Astana of the Kontinental Hockey League (KHL).
