= Hong Kong, China Ice Hockey Association =

Ice hockey governing body of Hong Kong, China

Hong Kong
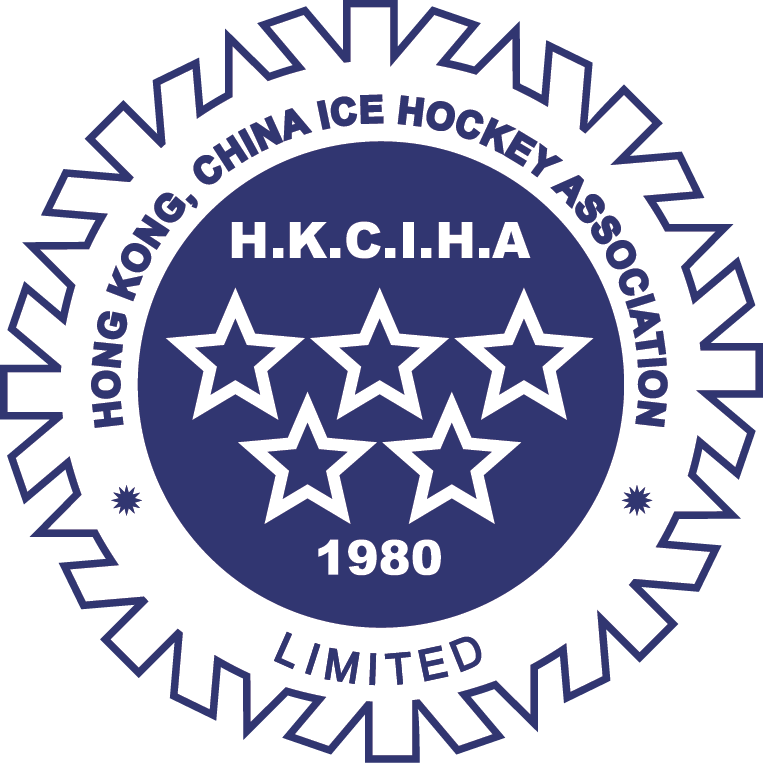
- Association name: Hong Kong, China Ice Hockey Association
- IIHF Code: HKG
- IIHF membership: April 30, 1983
- President: Mr. Chan Yan Wing (Sherman)
- IIHF men's ranking: 47th
- IIHF women's ranking: 30th

Hong Kong Ice Hockey Association
- Traditional Chinese: 中國香港冰球總會
- Simplified Chinese: 中国香港冰球总会
Transcriptions
Standard Mandarin
- Hanyu Pinyin: Zhōngguó Xiānggǎng Bīngqiú Xiéhuì

The Hong Kong, China Ice Hockey Association (HKCIHA) (formerly Hong Kong Ice Hockey Association) is the governing body of ice hockey in Hong Kong.

== History ==
HKCIHA (formerly HKIHA) was admitted to the International Ice Hockey Federation on April 30, 1983. It is one of the IIHF's full members. The current chairman is Chan Yan Wing (Sherman).

HKCIHA is mainly responsible for organizing the games of Hong Kong's men's, women's and junior teams. The association also organizes the game operations for the Hong Kong League.

== Recent competitions ==
=== 2026 IIHF Ice Hockey World Championships ===
==== U20 World Championship Division III, Group B - Kyrgyzstan, Bishkek ====
	Participating Team
Gold	Kyrgyzstan
Silver	Hong Kong, China
Bronze	Mexico
4th Place	Luxembourg
5th Place	South Africa
6th Place	Iran

=== Youth Pan-Pacific Series ===
2025 marks the beginning of the Youth Pan-Pacific Series, created to showcase emerging ice hockey talent in Australia, Hong Kong, China and New Zealand.

==== U18 Men's Results ====
	Participating Team
Gold	Hong Kong
Silver	Australia Gold
Bronze	Australia Green
4th Place	New Zealand

=== U-Series ===
In 2025, Hong Kong, China was included in the U-Series China National Youth Ice Hockey Championship for the first time, competing against provincial and city teams.

==== U18 Men's Results ====
	Participating Team
Gold	Beijing
Silver	Beijing Ice Hockey Association
Bronze	Hong Kong
4th Place	Shanghai
5th Place	Qiqihaer
6th Place	Wuhan
7th Place	Liaoning
8th Place	Jilin

==== U18 Women's Results ====
	Participating Team
Gold	Beijing
Silver	Sichuan
Bronze	Qiqihaer
4th Place	Harbin
5th Place	Sichuan Sports College
6th Place	Hong Kong
7th Place	Hebei
8th Place	Hulun Buir

==== U16 Men's Results ====
	Participating Team
Gold	Beijing
Silver	Hong Kong
Bronze	Qiqihaer
4th Place	Beijing Ice Hockey Association
5th Place	Jilin
6th Place	Harbin
7th Place	Shanghai
8th Place	Heilongjiang

==== U14 Men's Results ====
	Participating Team
Gold	Beijing
Silver	Hong Kong
Bronze	Beijing Ice Hockey Association
4th Place	Shanghai
5th Place	Harbin
6th Place	Qiqihaer
7th Place	Shandong
8th Place	Wuhan
9th Place	Heilongjiang
10th Place	Tianjin
11th Place	Hulun Buir
12th Place	Inner Mongolia

== In the news ==
=== May 2025 ===
Hong Kong was awarded the hosting rights to the 2026 IIHF Ice Hockey World Championship Division III, Group B, 2026 IIHF Ice Hockey Women's World Championship Division II, Group B, and 2026 IIHF Ice Hockey U18 World Championship Division III, Group A. Participants of the three tournaments include national teams from Belgium, Bulgaria, DPR Korea, Israel, Lithuania, Luxembourg, Mexico, Mongolia, New Zealand, Philippines, Türkiye, Ukraine and Uzbekistan. Together, they will make up the largest internationally recognized ice hockey event to be hosted in Hong Kong.

=== April 2025 ===
At the Cathay 2025 Hong Kong Sports Stars Awards (HKSSA), the Hong Kong Men's Ice Hockey Team was awarded the Sportsmanship Award for their commendable behavior during an altercation with the Turkmenistan Men's Ice Hockey Team, which took place at the 2025 Asian Winter Games in Harbin, China.

=== July 2024 ===
Kan stepped down as chairman and was replaced by Chan Yan Wing (Sherman), who headed significant changes within the association. Chan particularly focused on increasing transparency in Team Hong Kong's election process and raising coaching standards, to general support from the local ice hockey community.

=== September 2021 ===
SCMP published an article which detailed multiple complaints against the association, from former coaches and players. They accused the association of lacking transparency in corporate governance, as well as conflicts of interest between the chairman and the association, causing the development of the sport to be hampered. Some of those interviewed claimed that they had been frustrated with the association from the 1990s, and that letters to the LCSD had not fixed anything.
