= Samat Daniyar =

Kazakhstani ice hockey player

- Born: 24 January 1999 (age 27) Astana, Kazakhstan
- Height: 1.82 m (6 ft 0 in)
- Weight: 72 kg (159 lb; 11 st 5 lb)
- Position: Defence
- Shoots: Right
- KHL team Former teams: Barys Astana; HC Astana
- National team: Kazakhstan
- Playing career: 2016–present

Medal record

Ice hockey

Representing Kazakhstan

Asian Winter Games
Gold medal – first place	2025 Harbin	Ice hockey

Samat Merdenuly Daniyar (Kazakh: Самат Мерденұлы Данияр; born 24 January 1999) is a Kazakhstani ice hockey player for Barys Astana in the Kontinental Hockey League (KHL) and the Kazakhstani national team.

He represented Kazakhstan at the 2021 IIHF World Championship.
