= Korea Ice Hockey Association =

Ice hockey governing body in South Korea

South Korea
- Association name: Korea Ice Hockey Association
- IIHF Code: KOR
- IIHF membership: July 25, 1960
- President: Chung Mong-won
- IIHF men's ranking: 24 (▼1) (3 June 2026)
- IIHF women's ranking: 18 (3 June 2026)

- Korea Ice Hockey Association
- Hangul: 대한아이스하키협회
- Hanja: 大韓아이스하키協會
- RR: Daehan aiseuhaki hyeophoe
- MR: Taehan aisŭhak'i hyŏphoe

The Korea Ice Hockey Association (Korean: 대한아이스하키협회) is the governing body and member of the International Ice Hockey Federation (IIHF) that oversees ice hockey in South Korea.

The Korean Ice Hockey Association was able to compete in the Olympics for the first time during the 2018 Winter Olympics, under host nation rules.
