= Kirill Panyukov =

Kazakhstani ice hockey player (born 1997)

- Born: 22 May 1997 (age 29) Akmola, Kazakhstan
- Height: 1.85 m (6 ft 1 in)
- Weight: 84 kg (185 lb; 13 st 3 lb)
- Position: Left wing
- Shoots: Right
- KHL team Former teams: Barys Astana; Ak Bars Kazan; Avangard Omsk; Amur Khabarovsk
- National team: Kazakhstan
- NHL draft: Undrafted
- Playing career: 2013–present

Kirill Andreyevich Panyukov (Russian: Кирилл Андреевич Панюков; born 22 May 1997) is a Kazakhstani professional ice hockey winger who currently plays for Barys Astana of the Kontinental Hockey League (KHL).

== Playing career ==
Panyukov previously played North American junior hockey for the Sioux Falls Stampede of the United States Hockey League (USHL). He made his professional debut with homeland club, Barys Nur-Sultan of the KHL.

Following his fourth season in the KHL with Barys Nur-Sultan in 2020–21, Panyukov was traded to Russian club, Ak Bars Kazan, in exchange for monetary compensation on 15 May 2021.

Panyukin played two seasons with Omsk before he was traded with three years remaining on his contract to Avangard Omsk in exchange for financial compensation on 29 May 2023.

== International play ==
Internationally he has played for the Kazakhstan national junior team at two World Junior Championships, and played for the Kazakhstan national team at the 2017 World Championship Division I tournament.

== Career statistics ==
Medal record

Ice hockey

Representing Kazakhstan

Asian Winter Games
Gold medal – first place	2025 Harbin	Ice hockey

=== International ===
Year	Team	Event	Result	GP	G	A	Pts	PIM
2014	Kazakhstan	U18-I	13th	5	1	1	2	0
2015	Kazakhstan	U18-I	15th	5	2	2	4	0
2016	Kazakhstan	WJC-I	13th	5	0	4	4	0
2017	Kazakhstan	WJC-I	14th	5	2	3	5	28
2017	Kazakhstan	WC-I	13th	3	0	0	0	0
2021	Kazakhstan	WC	10th	7	2	0	2	0
2022	Kazakhstan	WC	14th	7	2	1	3	2
2024	Kazakhstan	WC	12th	7	0	1	1	0
2024	Kazakhstan	OGQ	DNQ	3	0	1	1	0
2025	Kazakhstan	AWG	1st place, gold medalist(s)	8	9	8	17	0
2025	Kazakhstan	WC	15th	7	0	0	0	4
Junior totals				20	5	10	15	28
Senior totals				42	13	11	24	6
