= Kirill Savitski =

Kazakhstani ice hockey player (born 1996)

- Born: 9 March 1996 (age 29); Oskemen, Kazakhstan
- Height: 1.83 m (6 ft 0 in)
- Weight: 89 kg (196 lb; 14 st 0 lb)
- Position: Left wing
- Shoots: Left
- KHL team Former teams: Barys Astana; Kazzinc-Torpedo
- National team: Kazakhstan
- NHL draft: Undrafted
- Playing career: 2013–present

Medal record

Ice hockey

Representing Kazakhstan

Asian Winter Games
Gold medal – first place	2025 Harbin	Ice hockey

Kirill Vladimirovich Savitski (Russian: Кирилл Владимирович Савицкий; born 9 March 1996) is a Kazakhstani ice hockey player for Barys Astana in the Kontinental Hockey League (KHL) and the Kazakhstani national team.

He represented Kazakhstan at the 2021 IIHF World Championship.
