= Harbin Sport University =

University in Harbin, China

- 哈尔滨体育学院
- Type: Public
- Location: Harbin, Heilongjiang, China
- Campus: Urban
- Website: www.hrbipe.edu.cn

Harbin Sport University
- Traditional Chinese: 哈爾濱體育學院
- Simplified Chinese: 哈尔滨体育学院
Transcriptions
Standard Mandarin
- Hanyu Pinyin: Hā'ěrbīn Tǐyù Xuéyuàn

Harbin Sport University (Chinese: 哈尔滨体育学院; pinyin: Hā'ěrbīn Tǐyù Xuéyuàn), also known as the Harbin Institute of Physical Education or HIPE, is a university in Harbin, China, working with research on health and sports.

In 2015, the announcement of a new Olympic winter sports center was made, to be set up at Harbin Sport University.

The Harbin Sport University is one of the initiators and main heads of the China Bandy Federation. Most of the players in the China national bandy team are students at Harbin Sport University. The university is also providing support for ice hockey in China by educating young players and developing the coaching program for the Chinese Ice Hockey Association.

The Harbin Sport University Stadium is an ice sports venue with a capacity of 6,000. It served as a venue for the B Division of the 2018 Bandy World Championship.
