= Ivan Stepanenko (ice hockey) =

- Born: 12 November 1995 (age 29); Karaganda, Kazakhstan
- Height: 1.86 m (6 ft 1 in)
- Weight: 94 kg (207 lb; 14 st 11 lb)
- Position: Defence
- Shoots: Left
- KHC team: Beibarys Atyrau
- National team: Kazakhstan
- NHL draft: Undrafted
- Playing career: 2015–present

Medal record

Ice hockey

Representing Kazakhstan

Asian Winter Games
Gold medal – first place	2025 Harbin	Ice hockey

Ivan Sergeyevich Stepanenko (Russian: Иван Сергеевич Степаненко; born 12 November 1995) is a Kazakhstani ice hockey player for Beibarys Atyrau and the Kazakhstani national team.

He represented Kazakhstan at the 2021 IIHF World Championship.
