= Artyom Likhotnikov =

Kazakhstani ice hockey player (born 1994)

- Born: 11 May 1994 (age 32) Temirtau, Kazakhstan
- Height: 6 ft 3 in (191 cm)
- Weight: 205 lb (93 kg; 14 st 9 lb)
- Position: Forward
- Shoots: Left
- VHL team Former teams: Molot-Prikamie Perm; Barys Astana
- National team: Kazakhstan
- Playing career: 2011–present

Artyom Vladimirovich Likhotnikov (Russian: Артем Владимирович Лихотников; born 11 May 1994) is a Kazakhstani professional ice hockey forward who is currently playing with Molot-Prikamie Perm in the Supreme Hockey League (VHL). He has formerly played with Barys Astana in the Kontinental Hockey League (KHL).

== Career statistics ==
Medal record

Ice hockey

Representing Kazakhstan

Asian Winter Games
Gold medal – first place	2025 Harbin	Ice hockey

=== International ===
Year	Team	Event	Result	GP	G	A	Pts	PIM
2021	Kazakhstan	WC	10th	4	2	1	3	0
2024	Kazakhstan	OGQ	DNQ	3	0	2	2	0
2025	Kazakhstan	AWG	1st place, gold medalist(s)	8	4	16	20	2
2025	Kazakhstan	WC	15th	6	0	0	0	0
Senior totals				21	6	19	25	2
