= Chinese Ice Hockey Association =

Ice hockey governing body of China

China
- Association name: Chinese Ice Hockey Association
- IIHF Code: CHN
- IIHF membership: July 25, 1963
- President: Wang Yitao
- IIHF men's ranking: 25 (▼1) (26 May 2025)
- IIHF women's ranking: 12 (▼1) (21 April 2025)

Chinese Ice Hockey Association
- Traditional Chinese: 中國冰球協會
- Simplified Chinese: 中国冰球协会
Transcriptions
Standard Mandarin
- Hanyu Pinyin: Zhōngguó Bīngqiú Xiéhuì

The Chinese Ice Hockey Association (CIHA) is the governing body of ice hockey in the People's Republic of China. It has been a member of the International Ice Hockey Federation (IIHF) since 1963.

It also covered bandy in China and joined the Federation of International Bandy (FIB) in 2010. In late 2014, China Bandy Federation was founded and replaced the ice hockey association as the FIB member.

== National teams ==
- China men's national ice hockey team
- China men's national junior ice hockey team
- China men's national under-18 ice hockey team
- China women's national ice hockey team
- China women's national under-18 ice hockey team

== See also ==
- Beijing International Ice Hockey League
- Ice hockey in China
