= Kazakhstan Ice Hockey Federation =

Kazakhstan
- Association name: Kazakhstan Ice Hockey Federation
- IIHF Code: KAZ
- IIHF membership: 6 May 1992
- President: Asqar Mamin
- IIHF men's ranking: 13 (▲1) (26 May 2025)
- IIHF women's ranking: 22 (21 April 2025)

The Kazakhstan Ice Hockey Federation (Kazakh: Қазақстан хоккей федерациясы, Qazaqstan Hokkei Federasiasy (QHF); Russian: Казахстанская федерация хоккея с шайбой) is the governing body of ice hockey in Kazakhstan. Kazakhstan was one of nine former republics of the Soviet Union to join the International Ice Hockey Federation (IIHF) on 6 May 1992.

As of 2019, Kazakhstan has 6,478 registered ice hockey players.

== National teams ==
=== Men ===
- Men's national team
- Men's under-20 national team
- Men's under-18 national team

=== Women ===
- Women's national team
- Women's under-18 national team
