= Harbin Ice Hockey Arena =

Indoor ice sport venue in Harbin, China

Coordinates: 45°45′57″N 126°38′13″E

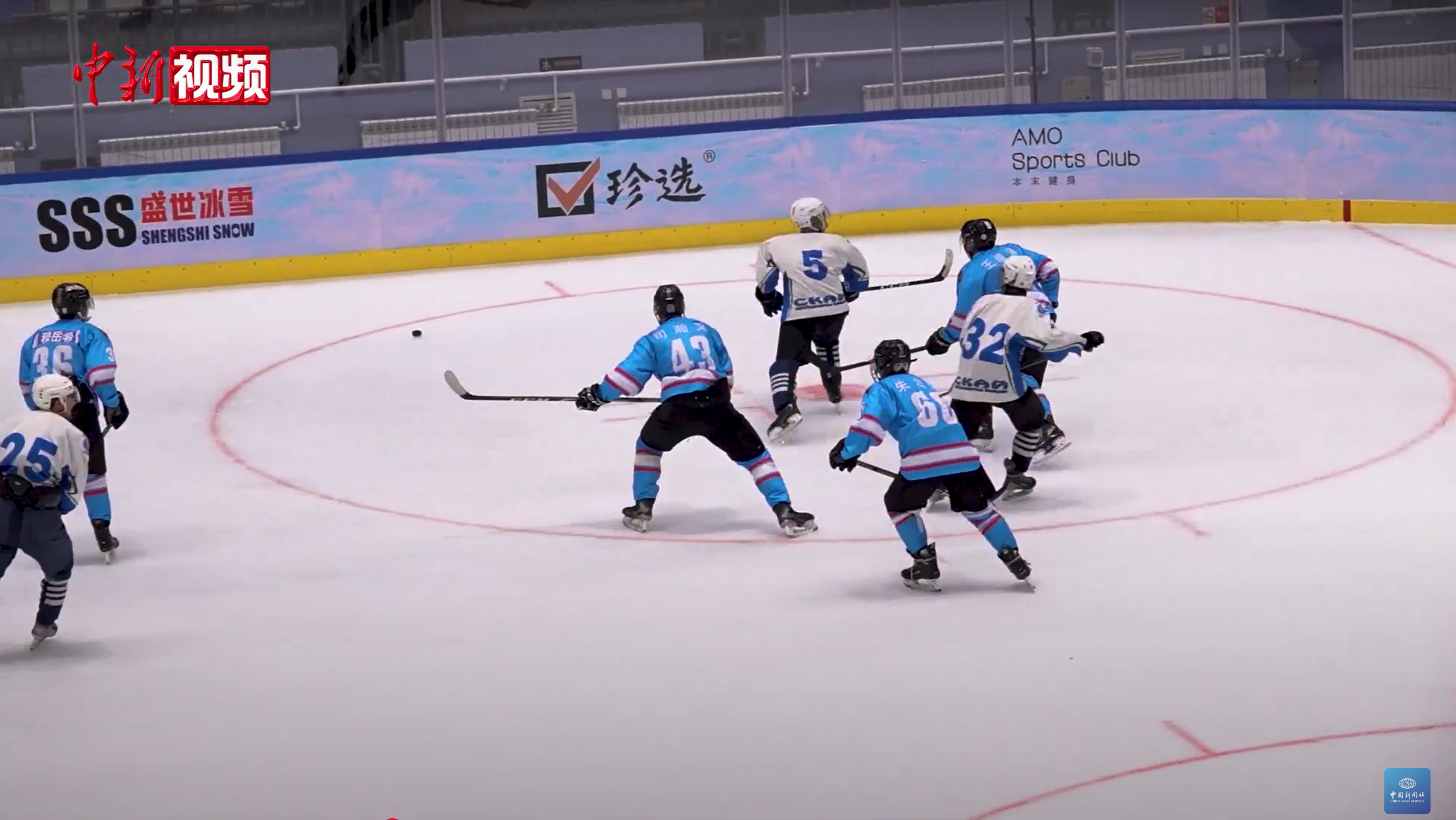
On October 14, 2024, the Shanghai Cooperation Organization Ice Hockey Match took place at Harbin Ice Hockey Arena. The Shenzhen Kunlunhongxing Ice Hockey Club of China competed against Russia's HC Primorsky Ice Hockey Team.

Harbin Ice Hockey Arena (Chinese: 哈尔滨冰球馆; pinyin: Hā'ěrbīn Bīngqiú Guǎn), formerly known as Baqu Arena, is an indoor sporting arena located in Harbin, Heilongjiang, China. The capacity of the arena is 5,500 people. It was the main arena used during the 1996 Asian Winter Games and the 2008 IIHF Women's World Championship.

== Basic profile ==
The Harbin Ice Hockey Stadium, located at No. 22 Baqu Street, Daowai District, Harbin, is a cornerstone of China's winter sports infrastructure. Established in 1993 and operated by the Harbin Municipal Sports Bureau, it spans 32,600 m² with four international-standard ice rinks (26×60 m to 30×60 m), making it China's largest indoor winter sports training and competition complex. The main arena accommodates 5,304 spectators (including 104 VIP seats) and meets stringent standards set by the IIHF, KHL, and NHL.

== Historical milestones ==
- 1996 Asian Winter Games: Hosted the opening ceremony and served as the primary venue, marking its debut on the international stage.
- Multi-Event Legacy: Over three decades, it has hosted over 100 major events, including the World Figure Skating Grand Prix, Women's World Ice Hockey Championships, and the 2009 Winter Universiade.
- 2025 Asian Winter Games: Designated as the men's ice hockey venue for the 9th Asian Winter Games (February 7–14, 2025), reaffirming its status as a premier Asian sports facility.
