= 2026 IIHF World Championship Division I =

Tournament details
- Host countries: Poland; China
- Venues: 2 (in 2 host cities)
- Dates: 2–8 May; 29 April – 5 May
- Teams: 12

The 2026 IIHF World Championship Division I consisted of two international ice hockey tournaments organized by the International Ice Hockey Federation. Divisions I A and I B represent the second and the third tier of the IIHF Ice Hockey World Championships.

In Group A, Kazakhstan and Ukraine gained promotion to the Top Division and Japan was relegated. In Group B, Estonia got the win and promoted.

== Group A tournament ==
2026 IIHF World Championship Division I A

Tournament details
- Host country: Poland
- City: Sosnowiec
- Venue: 1 (in 1 host city)
- Dates: 2–8 May
- Teams: 6

Tournament statistics
- Games played: 15
- Goals scored: 74 (4.93 per game)
- Attendance: 15,001 (1,000 per game)
- Scoring leader: (Ukraine) Danylo Trakht (8 points)

Official website
- Website

The Division I Group A tournament was played in Sosnowiec, Poland from 2 to 8 May 2026.

=== Participants ===
Team	Qualification
Kazakhstan	Placed 15th in the Elite Division in 2025 and was relegated.
France	Placed 16th in the Elite Division in 2025 and was relegated.
Ukraine	Placed 3rd in Division I A in 2025.
Japan	Placed 4th in Division I A in 2025.
Poland	Host, placed 5th in Division I A in 2025.
Lithuania	Placed 1st in Division I B in 2025 and was promoted.

=== Match officials ===
Seven referees and linesperson were selected for the tournament.

Referees	Linesperson
(Denmark) Niclas Lundsgaard; (France) Geoffrey Barcelo; (Germany) Killian Hinterdobler; (Hungary) Zsombor Pálkövi; (Latvia) Uldis Bušs; (Poland) Michał Baca; (United States) Logan Gruhl	(France) Quentin Ugolini; (Germany) Kai Jürgens; (Germany) Markus Merk; (Poland) Michał Żak; (Slovakia) Daniel Konc; (South Korea) Lim Jun-seo; (Switzerland) Eric Cattaneo

=== Standings ===
Pos	Team	Pld	W	OTW	OTL	L	GF	GA	GD	Pts	Promotion or relegation
1	Kazakhstan	5	3	2	0	0	20	8	+12	13	Promotion to the 2027 Top Division
2	Ukraine	5	3	0	1	1	14	12	+2	10	Promotion to the 2027 Top Division
3	France	5	1	2	1	1	12	11	+1	8 (Note: France 3–2 (GWS) Poland)	
4	Poland (H)	5	2	0	2	1	12	12	0	8	
5	Lithuania	5	0	1	2	2	7	12	−5	4	
6	Japan	5	0	1	0	4	9	19	−10	2	Relegation to the 2027 Division I B

Source: IIHF
Rules for classification: 1) points; 2) head-to-head points; 3) head-to-head goal difference; 4) head-to-head number of goals scored; 5) result against closest best-ranked team outside tied teams; 6) result against second-best ranked team outside tied teams; 7) seeding before tournament.
(H) Host

=== Results ===
All times are local (UTC+2).

2 May 2026; 12:30	Japan	3–4 (0–1, 1–1, 2–2)	France	Stadion Zimowy, Sosnowiec; Attendance: 391

Game reference

Yuta Narisawa
Issa Otsuka
Goalies
Antoine Keller
Referees:
(Poland) Michał Baca
(United States) Logan Gruhl
Linesmen:
(Slovakia) Daniel Konc
(South Korea) Lim Jun-seo

	0–1	18:55 – Leclerc (Gallet)
Takagi (Miura, Kimura) – 32:42	1–1
	1–2	38:35 – Simonsen (Guebey, Boudon) (PP)
F. Suzuki (Keller, Kimura) – 42:46	2–2
Satō (Nakajima, Hanzawa) – 43:28	3–2
	3–3	57:38 – Perret (Leclerc, Gueby) (EA)
	3–4	58:29 – Perret (Simonsen, Dusseau)

12 min
Penalties
4 min
16
Shots
46

2 May 2026; 16:00	Lithuania	1–4 (1–0, 0–0, 0–4)	Kazakhstan	Stadion Zimowy, Sosnowiec; Attendance: 368

Game reference

Faustas Nausėda
Goalies
Andrei Shutov
Referees:
(Germany) Killian Hinterdobler
(Denmark) Niclas Lundsgaard
Linesmen:
(Switzerland) Eric Cattaneo
(Poland) Michał Żak

Bendžius (Gintautas, Ališauskas) (PP) – 01:56	1–0
	1–1	41:23 – Savitski (Orazov, Beketayev)
	1–2	46:54 – Gatiyatov (Asetov)
	1–3	55:08 – Simonov (Nikitin, Logvin)
	1–4	58:17 – Khoroshev (Gatiyatov, Shaikhmeddenov)

8 min
Penalties
4 min
13
Shots
33

2 May 2026; 19:30	Poland	3–2 (1–1, 1–0, 1–1)	Ukraine	Stadion Zimowy, Sosnowiec; Attendance: 2,567

Game reference

Tomáš Fučík
Goalies
Bogdan Dyachenko
Referees:
(France) Geoffrey Barcelo
(Hungary) Zsombor Pálkövi
Linesmen:
(Germany) Kai Jürgens
(France) Quentin Ugolini

Chmielewski (Biłas, Zygmunt) – 12:56	1–0
	1–1	17:50 – Trakht (Fadyeyev, Vorona) (PP)
Wronka (Wałęga, Łyszczarczyk) (PP) – 28:49	2–1
	2–2	42:38 – Denyskin (Merezhko, Ratushny)
Krężołek (Górny, Wałęga) – 53:26	3–2

22 min
Penalties
32 min
22
Shots
32

3 May 2026; 12:30	Kazakhstan	6–0 (0–0, 3–0, 3–0)	Japan	Stadion Zimowy, Sosnowiec; Attendance: 350

Game reference

Nikita Boyarkin
Goalies
Issa Otsuka
Referees:
(Poland) Michał Baca
(Latvia) Uldis Bušs
Linesmen:
(Slovakia) Daniel Konc
(Poland) Michał Żak

Kaiyrzhan (Gatiyatov, Omirbekov) – 22:11	1–0
Shaikhmeddenov (Gatiyatov) – 27:56	2–0
Breus (Gatiyatov, Asetov) – 33:13	3–0
Asetov (Daniyar, Shestakov) (PP) – 54:40	4–0
Starchenko (Muratov, Shestakov) – 55:50	5–0
Lyapunov (Omirbekov, Kaiyrzhan) – 56:26	6–0

4 min
Penalties
4 min
42
Shots
16

3 May 2026; 16:00	Ukraine	2–1 (1–0, 1–1, 0–0)	Lithuania	Stadion Zimowy, Sosnowiec; Attendance: 428

Game reference

Bogdan Dyachenko
Goalies
Laurynas Lubys
Referees:
(Germany) Killian Hinterdobler
(Hungary) Zsombor Pálkövi
Linesmen:
(South Korea) Lim Jun-seo
(France) Quentin Ugolini

Merezhko (Peresunko, Vorona) (PP) – 15:02	1–0
Trakht (Peresunko, Fadyeyev) (PP) – 28:18	2–0
	2–1	32:01 – Jukna (Rumševičius, Krakauskas)

4 min
Penalties
10 min
35
Shots
18

3 May 2026; 19:30	France	3–2 GWS (0–0, 1–2, 1–0) (OT: 0–0) (SO: 1–0)	Poland	Stadion Zimowy, Sosnowiec; Attendance: 2,194

Game reference

Quentin Papillon
Goalies
Tomáš Fučík
Referees:
(United States) Logan Gruhl
(Denmark) Niclas Lundsgaard
Linesmen:
(Switzerland) Eric Cattaneo
(Germany) Markus Merk

	0–1	23:22 – Krężołek (Naróg, Chmielewski) (PP)
Perret (Boudon) – 30:51	1–1
	1–2	34:40 – Pociecha (Wronka, Łyszczarczyk) (PP)
Perret (Simonsen, Boudon) – 42:35	2–2

Bruche
Boudon (miss)
Perret (miss)
Bougro (miss)
Simonsen (miss)
Bruche
Bruche (miss)
Boudon (miss)
Bruche (miss)
Simonsen
Shootout
(miss) Syty
(miss) Krężołek
(miss) Zygmunt
Łyszczarczyk
(miss) Paś
Łyszczarczyk
(miss) Łyszczarczyk
(miss) Syty
(miss) Łyszczarczyk
(miss) Krężołek
14 min
Penalties
33 min
35
Shots
28

5 May 2026; 12:30	Lithuania	2–3 OT (0–1, 1–1, 1–0) (OT: 0–1)	Japan	Stadion Zimowy, Sosnowiec; Attendance: 139

Game reference

Faustas Nausėda
Goalies
Yuta Narisawa
Referees:
(France) Geoffrey Barcelo
(Hungary) Zsombor Pálkövi
Linesmen:
(Switzerland) Eric Cattaneo
(Germany) Kai Jürgens

	0–1	08:33 – Satō (Hanzawa, Nakajima) (PP)
	0–2	20:18 – Yoneyama (Nakajima, Satō) (PP)
Grinius (Krakauskas, Noreika) (PP) – 25:40	1–2
Čižas (Sadauskas, Ališauskas) (PP) – 40:41	2–2
	2–3	60:35 – Satō (Nakajima, Yoneyama)

12 min
Penalties
8 min
35
Shots
29

5 May 2026; 16:00	France	2–3 (0–2, 2–1, 0–0)	Ukraine	Stadion Zimowy, Sosnowiec; Attendance: 390

Game reference

Quentin Papillon
Goalies
Bogdan Dyachenko
Referees:
(Germany) Killian Hinterdobler
(Denmark) Niclas Lundsgaard
Linesmen:
(Slovakia) Daniel Konc
(Germany) Markus Merk

	0–1	05:43 – Hrebenyk (Kuprianov, Morozov)
	0–2	10:08 – Merezhko (Trakht, Vorona) (PP)
Bruche (Bougro, Thiry) – 22:20	1–2
Boudon (Boscq, Cantagallo) – 32:59	2–2
	2–3	38:15 – Trakht (Vorona)

2 min
Penalties
2 min
31
Shots
20

5 May 2026; 19:30	Kazakhstan	3–2 (0–1, 0–0, 3–1)	Poland	Stadion Zimowy, Sosnowiec; Attendance: 2,188

Game reference

Andrei Shutov
Goalies
Tomáš Fučík
Referees:
(Latvia) Uldis Bušs
(United States) Logan Gruhl
Linesmen:
(South Korea) Lim Jun-seo
(France) Quentin Ugolini

	0–1	01:09 – Wronka (Łyszczarczyk, Naróg)
Muratov (Mikhailov, Shestakov) – 48:01	1–1
Simonov (Logvin, Lyapunov) – 57:53	2–1
Savitski (Kaiyrzhan, Shestakov) (EN) – 58:53	3–1
	3–2	59:58 – Krężołek (Wałęga, Wronka)

2 min
Penalties
4 min
27
Shots
21

7 May 2026; 12:30	France	2–1 GWS (0–1, 1–0, 0–0) (OT: 0–0) (SO: 1–0)	Lithuania	Stadion Zimowy, Sosnowiec; Attendance: 161

Game reference
Quentin Papillon	Goalies	Faustas Nausėda	Referees: (Poland) Michał Baca (Latvia) Uldis Bušs; Linesmen: (South Korea) Lim Jun-seo (Poland) Michał Żak
/ 0–1 / 17:29 – Grinius (Jukna); Douay (Bougro, Leclerc) – 22:11 / 1–1			Referees: (Poland) Michał Baca (Latvia) Uldis Bušs; Linesmen: (South Korea) Lim Jun-seo (Poland) Michał Żak
Bruche; Boudon (miss); Perret (miss); Bougro (miss); Simonsen	Shootout	Krakauskas; (miss) Grinius; (miss) Sadauskas; (miss) Čižas; (miss) Četvertak	Referees: (Poland) Michał Baca (Latvia) Uldis Bušs; Linesmen: (South Korea) Lim Jun-seo (Poland) Michał Żak
2 min	Penalties	4 min	Referees: (Poland) Michał Baca (Latvia) Uldis Bušs; Linesmen: (South Korea) Lim Jun-seo (Poland) Michał Żak
30	Shots	20	Referees: (Poland) Michał Baca (Latvia) Uldis Bušs; Linesmen: (South Korea) Lim Jun-seo (Poland) Michał Żak

7 May 2026; 16:00	Ukraine	4–5 GWS (0–1, 3–2, 1–1) (OT: 0–0) (SO: 0–1)	Kazakhstan	Stadion Zimowy, Sosnowiec; Attendance: 441

Game reference

Bogdan Dyachenko
Goalies
Nikita Boyarkin
Referees:
(France) Geoffrey Barcelo
(United States) Logan Gruhl
Linesmen:
(Slovakia) Daniel Konc
(Germany) Markus Merk

	0–1	12:37 – Logvin
Denyskin (Merezhko) – 20:11	1–1
	1–2	30:33 – Lyapunov (Logvin, Simonov)
	1–3	32:30 – Starchenko
Merezhko (Peresunko, Trakht) (PP) – 33:55	2–3
Peresunko (Ratushny, Kosarev) – 39:42	3–3
Fadyeyev (Hrebenyk, Trakht) – 50:58	4–3
	4–4	51:45 – Muratov (Daniyar, Shestakov)

Denyskin
Trakht (miss)
Vorona (miss)
Fadyeyev (miss)
Peresunko (miss)
Shootout
(miss) Savitski
Logvin
(miss) Starchenko
(miss) Gatiyatov
Muratov
2 min
Penalties
6 min
19
Shots
42

7 May 2026; 19:30	Japan	2–4 (1–1, 1–1, 0–2)	Poland	Stadion Zimowy, Sosnowiec; Attendance: 1,907

Game reference

Yuta Narisawa
Goalies
Tomáš Fučík
Referees:
(Denmark) Niclas Lundsgaard
(Hungary) Zsombor Pálkövi
Linesmen:
(Switzerland) Eric Cattaneo
(Germany) Kai Jürgens

	0–1	05:56 – Paś (Pociecha, Wronka) (PP)
Hanzawa (Nakajima, Halliday) – 15:32	1–1
	1–2	31:22 – Komorski (Krężołek, Chmielewski) (PP)
Hanzawa (Satō, Yoneyama) – 37:46	2–2
	2–3	52:00 – Wronka (Paś, Łyszczarczyk)
	2–4	58:26 – Krężołek (Wanacki, Ciura) (SH, EN)

8 min
Penalties
8 min
36
Shots
29

8 May 2026; 12:30	Kazakhstan	2–1 GWS (0–0, 0–0, 1–1) (OT: 0–0) (SO: 1–0)	France	Stadion Zimowy, Sosnowiec; Attendance: 468

Game reference
Andrei Shutov	Goalies	Antoine Keller	Referees: (Poland) Michał Baca (United States) Logan Gruhl; Linesmen: (Switzerland) Eric Cattaneo (Germany) Kai Jürgens
/ 0–1 / 45:17 – Dair (Grossetete, Guebey); Breus (Mikhailov, Shaikhmeddenov) – 50:44 / 1–1			Referees: (Poland) Michał Baca (United States) Logan Gruhl; Linesmen: (Switzerland) Eric Cattaneo (Germany) Kai Jürgens
Savitski (miss); Logvin (miss); Starchenko; Gatiyatov (miss); Muratov; Starchenko	Shootout	Bruche; (miss) Boudon; (miss) Perret; (miss) Bougro; Simonsen; (miss) Bruche	Referees: (Poland) Michał Baca (United States) Logan Gruhl; Linesmen: (Switzerland) Eric Cattaneo (Germany) Kai Jürgens
0 min	Penalties	4 min	Referees: (Poland) Michał Baca (United States) Logan Gruhl; Linesmen: (Switzerland) Eric Cattaneo (Germany) Kai Jürgens
31	Shots	26	Referees: (Poland) Michał Baca (United States) Logan Gruhl; Linesmen: (Switzerland) Eric Cattaneo (Germany) Kai Jürgens

8 May 2026; 16:00	Ukraine	3–1 (3–1, 0–0, 0–0)	Japan	Stadion Zimowy, Sosnowiec; Attendance: 536

Game reference

Bogdan Dyachenko
Goalies
Issa Otsuka
Referees:
(Germany) Killian Hinterdobler
(Denmark) Niclas Lundsgaard
Linesmen:
(France) Quentin Ugolini
(Poland) Michał Żak

	0–1	10:45 – Murakami (Satō, Nakajima)
Peresunko – 13:09	1–1
Dakhnovsky (Trakht, Vorona) – 15:11	2–1
Trakht (Vorona) – 17:24	3–1

8 min
Penalties
10 min
18
Shots
31

8 May 2026; 19:30	Poland	1–2 OT (0–1, 1–0, 0–0) (OT: 0–1)	Lithuania	Stadion Zimowy, Sosnowiec; Attendance: 2,473

Game reference

Tomáš Fučík
Goalies
Faustas Nausėda
Referees:
(France) Geoffrey Barcelo
(Latvia) Uldis Bušs
Linesmen:
(Slovakia) Daniel Konc
(Germany) Markus Merk

	0–1	08:53 – Gintautas (Ališauskas, Čižas) (PP)
Krężołek (Wałęga, Chmielewski) – 37:59	1–1
	1–2	61:43 – Četvertak (Ališauskas, Nausėda)

6 min
Penalties
8 min
39
Shots
25

=== Statistics ===
==== Scoring leaders ====
List shows the top skaters sorted by points, then goals.

Player	GP	G	A	Pts	+/−	PIM	POS
(Ukraine) Danylo Trakht	5	4	4	8	+1	0	F
(Poland) Patryk Krężołek	5	5	1	6	+1	6	F
(Japan) Yū Satō	5	3	3	6	+1	2	F
(Poland) Patryk Wronka	5	3	3	6	+2	2	F
(Japan) Teruto Nakajima	5	0	6	6	−2	4	F
(Ukraine) Oleksiy Vorona	5	0	6	6	0	2	F
(Ukraine) Ihor Merezhko	5	3	2	5	0	0	D
(Ukraine) Oleksandr Peresunko	5	2	3	5	+2	2	F
(Kazakhstan) Artur Gatiyatov	5	1	4	5	+6	0	F
(Kazakhstan) Arkadiy Shestakov	5	0	5	5	+3	0	F

GP = Games played; G = Goals; A = Assists; Pts = Points; +/− = Plus/Minus; PIM = Penalties in Minutes; POS = Position
Source: IIHF.com

==== Goaltending leaders ====
Only the top five goaltenders, based on save percentage, who have played at least 40% of their team's minutes, are included in this list.

Player	TOI	GA	GAA	SA	Sv%	SO
(Poland) Tomáš Fučík	304:27	10	1.97	153	93.46	0
(Kazakhstan) Andrei Shutov	185:00	4	1.30	60	93.33	0
(Japan) Yuta Narisawa	167:31	7	2.51	104	93.27	0
(Lithuania) Faustas Nausėda	247:13	9	2.18	130	93.08	0
(Ukraine) Bogdan Dyachenko	303:33	11	2.17	143	92.31	0

TOI = time on ice (minutes:seconds); SA = shots against; GA = goals against; GAA = goals against average; Sv% = save percentage; SO = shutouts
Source: IIHF.com

=== Awards ===
Position	Player
Goaltender	(Poland) Tomáš Fučík
Defenceman	(Ukraine) Ihor Merezhko
Forward	(Ukraine) Danylo Trakht

== Group B tournament ==
2026 IIHF World Championship Division I B

Tournament details
- Host country: China
- City: Shenzhen
- Venue: 1 (in 1 host city)
- Dates: 29 April – 5 May
- Teams: 6

Tournament statistics
- Games played: 15
- Goals scored: 103 (6.87 per game)
- Attendance: 10,509 (701 per game)
- Scoring leader: (China) Hou Yuyang (12 points)

Official website
- Website

The Division I Group B tournament was played in Shenzhen, China from 29 April to 5 May 2026.

No team was relegated because of the cancellation of the Division II A tournament.

=== Participants ===
Team	Qualification
Romania	Placed 6th in Division I A in 2025 and was relegated.
South Korea	Placed 2nd in Division I B in 2025.
Estonia	Placed 3rd in Division I B in 2025.
China	Host, placed 4th in Division I B in 2025.
Spain	Placed 5th in Division I B in 2025.
Netherlands	Placed 1st in Division II A in 2025 and was promoted.

=== Match officials ===
Seven referees and linesperson were selected for the tournament.

Referees	Linesperson
(Canada) Adam Forbes; (China) Feng Lei; (Czech Republic) Jan Jaroš; (Finland) Henri Neva; (Poland) Wojciech Czech; (Switzerland) Roland Gerber; (Sweden) Andreas Harnebring	(China) Chi Hongda; (Denmark) Emil Dalsgaard; (Italy) Lukas Fleischmann; (Poland) Michał Gerne; (Slovakia) Tomáš Gegáň; (Slovenia) Gašper Zgonc; (Sweden) Christian Billing

=== Standings ===
Pos	Team	Pld	W	OTW	OTL	L	GF	GA	GD	Pts	Promotion
1	Estonia	5	4	0	1	0	27	10	+17	13	Promotion to the 2027 Division I A
2	China (H)	5	2	2	0	1	21	16	+5	10 (Note: Romania 3–4 (OT) China)	
3	Romania	5	3	0	1	1	19	9	+10	10	
4	South Korea	5	3	0	0	2	20	17	+3	9	
5	Spain	5	1	0	0	4	11	25	−14	3	
6	Netherlands	5	0	0	0	5	5	26	−21	0	

Source: IIHF
Rules for classification: 1) points; 2) head-to-head points; 3) head-to-head goal difference; 4) head-to-head number of goals scored; 5) result against closest best-ranked team outside tied teams; 6) result against second-best ranked team outside tied teams; 7) seeding before tournament.
(H) Host

=== Results ===
All times are local (UTC+8).

29 April 2026; 12:30	Spain	2–12 (0–6, 0–1, 2–5)	Estonia	Shenzhen Universiade Sports Centre, Shenzhen; Attendance: 112

Game reference

Raúl Barbo
Pablo Salvador
Goalies
Conrad Mölder
Referees:
(China) Feng Lei
(Sweden) Andreas Harnebring
Linesmen:
(Denmark) Emil Dalsgaard
(Slovakia) Tomáš Gegáň

	0–1	04:59 – Linde (Antonov, Kiik)
	0–2	05:57 – Timofejev (Jürgens, Kombe)
	0–3	07:20 – Savenkov (Luht, Viitanen)
	0–4	10:07 – Timofejev (Kombe)
	0–5	17:00 – Timofejev (Kombe)
	0–6	19:14 – Vasjonkin (Kiik, Linde)
	0–7	25:31 – Kiik (SH)
González (Cerdà) – 40:42	1–7
	1–8	41:59 – Linde (Kiik, Antonov)
	1–9	49:34 – Burkov (Arrak, Vasjonkin)
	1–10	53:27 – Savenkov (M. Potšinok, E. Potšinok)
	1–11	56:57 – Kiik (Lovkov)
	1–12	57:58 – Jürgens (Kombe, Timofejev)
González (Sahagún, Carbonell) – 58:28	2–12

8 min
Penalties
20 min
24
Shots
47

29 April 2026; 16:00	Netherlands	0–7 (0–2, 0–3, 0–2)	Romania	Shenzhen Universiade Sports Centre, Shenzhen; Attendance: 103

Game reference

Cedrick Andree
Goalies
Attila Adorján
Referees:
(Poland) Wojciech Czech
(Switzerland) Roland Gerber
Linesmen:
(Sweden) Christian Billing
(China) Chi Hongda

0–1	11:36 – Császár (Skachkov)
0–2	14:16 – Részegh (Császár, Skachkov) (PP)
0–3	26:21 – Haaranen (Kánya, Rokaly-Boldizsár)
0–4	34:27 – Skachkov (Haaranen, Részegh) (PP2)
0–5	35:57 – Molnár (Császár, Péter) (PP)
0–6	44:14 – Részegh (Péter, Molnár)
0–7	49:21 – Péter (Molnár, Részegh)

10 min
Penalties
6 min
10
Shots
39

29 April 2026; 19:30	China	4–7 (1–1, 1–4, 2–2)	South Korea	Shenzhen Universiade Sports Centre, Shenzhen; Attendance: 2,180

Game reference

Chen Shifeng
Tu Yueran
Goalies
Lee Yeon-seung
Referees:
(Canada) Adam Forbes
(Finland) Henri Neva
Linesmen:
(Italy) Lukas Fleischmann
(Slovenia) Gašper Zgonc

	0–1	10:05 – Kim Sang-w. (Ahn, Oh)
Huang (Guo) – 12:54	1–1
	1–2	29:59 – Kang Y. (Shin D.)
Yan R. (Hou, Wang J.) (PP) – 31:10	2–2
	2–3	32:02 – Kim G. (Kim Sang-w.)
	2–4	32:48 – Kim Si. (Shin S., Nam)
	2–5	37:27 – Kim Sang-y. (Nam, Kim Sang-w.) (PP)
Wang J. (Zhang P., Hou) (PP) – 45:44	3–5
	3–6	47:13 – Kim G. (Nam, Kim Sang-y.) (PP)
Zhang Z. (Wang H., Zheng) (PP) – 55:21	4–6
	4–7	58:27 – Kim Sang-w. (Kong, Kim Se.) (EN)

10 min
Penalties
10 min
24
Shots
46

30 April 2026; 12:30	Estonia	5–1 (0–0, 2–1, 3–0)	Netherlands	Shenzhen Universiade Sports Centre, Shenzhen; Attendance: 132

Game reference

Georg Vladimirov
Goalies
Martijn Oosterwijk
Referees:
(Canada) Adam Forbes
(Czech Republic) Jan Jaroš
Linesmen:
(Slovakia) Tomáš Gegáň
(Poland) Michał Gerne

Burkov (Timofejev, Arrak) – 21:21	1–0
Kiik (Arrak, R. Ossipov) (SH) – 29:25	2–0
	2–1	38:25 – Borgman
Timofejev (Jürgens, Kombe) – 47:26	3–1
Kiik (Antonov, Sildre) (EN) – 58:08	4–1
M. Potšinok (E. Potšinok, Puzakov) – 58:29	5–1

6 min
Penalties
18 min
50
Shots
14

30 April 2026; 16:00	South Korea	6–4 (1–1, 4–0, 1–3)	Spain	Shenzhen Universiade Sports Centre, Shenzhen; Attendance: 107

Game reference

Jang Ga-ram
Goalies
Raúl Barbo
Pablo Salvador
Referees:
(Poland) Wojciech Czech
(China) Feng Lei
Linesmen:
(China) Chi Hongda
(Slovenia) Gašper Zgonc

Kim Si. (Shin S., Chung) – 05:56	1–0
	1–1	10:09 – Torralba (Burgos)
Kim G. – 20:35	2–1
Nam (Song, Kim Sang-y.) – 21:27	3–1
Shin S. (Nam, Kim Sang-y.) (PP2) – 26:46	4–1
Ahn (Nam, Kim Sang-w.) (PP) – 28:00	5–1
	5–2	42:01 – Cerdà (González, Carbonell)
	5–3	45:38 – González (Carbonell)
	5–4	47:23 – Capillas (Burgos)
Shin S. (Kim Sang-y., Nam) (PP, EN) – 59:13	6–4

2 min
Penalties
10 min
36
Shots
10

30 April 2026; 19:30	Romania	3–4 OT (1–1, 0–1, 2–1) (OT: 0–1)	China	Shenzhen Universiade Sports Centre, Shenzhen; Attendance: 1,394

Game reference

Rasmus Rinne
Goalies
Tu Yueran
Referees:
(Switzerland) Roland Gerber
(Sweden) Andreas Harnebring
Linesmen:
(Sweden) Christian Billing
(Denmark) Emil Dalsgaard

Részegh (Skachkov, Péter) (PP) – 08:00	1–0
	1–1	19:11 – Wang J. (Hou, Zong)
	1–2	36:46 – Zhang J.
Skachkov (Péter, Haaranen) (PP) – 46:52	2–2
	2–3	56:56 – Chen Z. (Huang, Guo)
Imre (Skachkov, Császár) – 57:44	3–3
	3–4	60:27 – Hou (PS)

10 min
Penalties
16 min
42
Shots
25

2 May 2026; 12:30	Romania	4–1 (1–1, 3–0, 0–0)	Spain	Shenzhen Universiade Sports Centre, Shenzhen; Attendance: 104

Game reference

Attila Adorján
Goalies
Pablo Salvador
Referees:
(China) Feng Lei
(Finland) Henri Neva
Linesmen:
(Italy) Lukas Fleischmann
(Slovakia) Tomáš Gegáň

Imre (Haaranen, Bors) – 03:46	1–0
	1–1	16:01 – Capillas (Torralba, Baldris) (PP)
Részegh (Császár, Péter) (PP) – 24:10	2–1
Rokaly-Boldizsár (Sándor Székely) – 25:55	3–1
Császár (Imre, Mesikämmen) – 32:50	4–1

12 min
Penalties
8 min
25
Shots
22

2 May 2026; 16:00	South Korea	2–4 (2–1, 0–1, 0–2)	Estonia	Shenzhen Universiade Sports Centre, Shenzhen; Attendance: 125

Game reference

Lee Yeon-seung
Goalies
Conrad Mölder
Referees:
(Canada) Adam Forbes
(Sweden) Andreas Harnebring
Linesmen:
(China) Chi Hongda
(Poland) Michał Gerne

Kang Y. (Shin D., Lee D.) – 04:51	1–0
	1–1	12:34 – Kombe (R. Ossipov, Jürgens)
Shin S. (Nam, Song) – 13:34	2–1
	2–2	21:57 – E. Potšinok
	2–3	46:03 – Burkov
	2–4	59:00 – Timofejev (EN)

2 min
Penalties
2 min
29
Shots
19

2 May 2026; 19:30	Netherlands	3–6 (0–3, 3–2, 0–1)	China	Shenzhen Universiade Sports Centre, Shenzhen; Attendance: 2,404

Game reference

Ruud Leeuwesteijn
Cedrick Andree
Goalies
Chen Shifeng
Referees:
(Poland) Wojciech Czech
(Czech Republic) Jan Jaroš
Linesmen:
(Sweden) Christian Billing
(Slovenia) Gašper Zgonc

	0–1	06:26 – Wang H. (Wang J., Hou)
	0–2	08:35 – Wang H. (Guo, Zheng)
	0–3	16:19 – Hou
	0–4	29:39 – Chen Z. (Guo, Huang)
Borgman (Sars) (PP) – 31:17	1–4
Stempher (Van der Schuit) – 33:09	2–4
Van der Schuit (Stempher, Borgman) (PP) – 35:28	3–4
	3–5	38:21 – Yan J. (Hou, Zhang J.)
	3–6	58:28 – Hou (Wang J., Guo) (EN)

8 min
Penalties
8 min
28
Shots
32

3 May 2026; 12:30	Estonia	3–1 (1–0, 0–1, 2–0)	Romania	Shenzhen Universiade Sports Centre, Shenzhen; Attendance: 106

Game reference

Conrad Mölder
Goalies
Attila Adorján
Referees:
(Poland) Wojciech Czech
(Finland) Henri Neva
Linesmen:
(Denmark) Emil Dalsgaard
(Italy) Lukas Fleischmann

Viitanen (Arrak) – 01:23	1–0
	1–1	22:43 – Gajdó (Láday)
Viitanen (Jürgens, Kombe) – 57:58	2–1
Kombe (Timofejev, Arrak) (EN) – 59:41	3–1

2 min
Penalties
4 min
27
Shots
21

3 May 2026; 16:00	South Korea	4–1 (2–1, 0–0, 2–0)	Netherlands	Shenzhen Universiade Sports Centre, Shenzhen; Attendance: 207

Game reference

Lee Yeon-seung
Goalies
Cedrick Andree
Referees:
(China) Feng Lei
(Czech Republic) Jan Jaroš
Linesmen:
(Sweden) Christian Billing
(China) Chi Hongda

Shin S. (Kang M., Kim Sang-w.) (PP) – 04:13	1–0
	1–1	09:08 – Stempher (Van der Schuit)
Ahn – 17:43	2–1
Shin S. (Ahn, Kim Sang-w) – 58:20	3–1
Kim Se. (Kim G., Kang Y.) (EN) – 59:37	4–1

8 min
Penalties
8 min
56
Shots
22

3 May 2026; 19:30	China	3–0 (0–0, 0–0, 3–0)	Spain	Shenzhen Universiade Sports Centre, Shenzhen; Attendance: 1,754

Game reference

Tu Yueran
Goalies
Raúl Barbo
Referees:
(Canada) Adam Forbes
(Switzerland) Roland Gerber
Linesmen:
(Poland) Michał Gerne
(Slovenia) Gašper Zgonc

Hou (Wang J., Wang H.) – 53:50	1–0
Hou (PP) – 55:03	2–0
Liu (EN) – 57:30	3–0

10 min
Penalties
14 min
32
Shots
21

5 May 2026; 12:30	Romania	4–1 (1–0, 2–1, 1–0)	South Korea	Shenzhen Universiade Sports Centre, Shenzhen; Attendance: 101

Game reference

Attila Adorján
Goalies
Lee Yeon-seung
Referees:
(Switzerland) Roland Gerber
(Czech Republic) Jan Jaroš
Linesmen:
(Sweden) Christian Billing
(Denmark) Emil Dalsgaard

Skachkov (Császár, Péter) (PP) – 08:13	1–0
	1–1	27:26 – Kang M. (Shin S., Kim Sang-w.) (PP)
Gecse (Kánya) – 30:25	2–1
Császár (Részegh, Péter) (PP) – 38:15	3–1
Részegh (Császár, Péter) – 54:47	4–1

6 min
Penalties
6 min
33
Shots
29

5 May 2026; 16:00	Spain	4–0 (1–0, 0–0, 3–0)	Netherlands	Shenzhen Universiade Sports Centre, Shenzhen; Attendance: 112

Game reference

Raúl Barbo
Goalies
Martijn Oosterwijk
Referees:
(Canada) Adam Forbes
(Sweden) Andreas Harnebring
Linesmen:
(China) Chi Hongda
(Italy) Lukas Fleischmann

Baldris (Burgos, García) – 03:49	1–0
García (Zaballa, Donath) – 51:03	2–0
Zaballa (Donath, García) – 57:13	3–0
Cerdà (Collado, Rubio) – 58:40	4–0

8 min
Penalties
2 min
32
Shots
29

5 May 2026; 19:30	Estonia	3–4 GWS (0–2, 1–1, 2–0) (OT: 0–0) (SO: 0–1)	China	Shenzhen Universiade Sports Centre, Shenzhen; Attendance: 1,568

Game reference

Conrad Mölder
Goalies
Tu Yueran
Referees:
(Poland) Wojciech Czech
(Finland) Henri Neva
Linesmen:
(Slovakia) Tomáš Gegáň
(Poland) Michał Gerne

	0–1	04:40 – Hou (Yu, Yan R.)
	0–2	15:17 – Yu (Wang J., Zhang P.) (PP)
	0–3	22:11 – Hou (Yan R., Yu)
Timofejev (Burkov, Jürgens) – 31:10	1–3
Sildre – 48:59	2–3
Viitanen (Arrak, Puzakov) – 49:22	3–3

Lovkov (miss)
Burkov
Timofejev (miss)
Arrak (miss)
Viitanen
Shootout
(miss) Yu
(miss) Wang J.
Hou
Guo
Zheng
6 min
Penalties
8 min
42
Shots
26

=== Statistics ===
==== Scoring leaders ====
List shows the top skaters sorted by points, then goals.

Player	GP	G	A	Pts	+/−	PIM	POS
(China) Hou Yuyang	5	7	5	12	+3	6	F
(Estonia) David Timofejev	5	6	3	9	+8	2	F
(Romania) Hunor Császár	5	3	6	9	+4	4	F
(Romania) Balázs Péter	5	1	8	9	0	2	F
(Romania) Tamás Részegh	5	5	3	8	−1	0	F
(South Korea) Shin Sang-hoon	5	5	3	8	+2	2	F
(Estonia) Kristjan Kombe	5	2	6	8	+8	0	F
(South Korea) Kim Sang-wook	5	2	6	8	−1	2	F
(South Korea) Nam Hee-doo	5	1	7	8	+2	0	D
(Estonia) Rasmus Kiik	5	4	3	7	+8	0	F

GP = Games played; G = Goals; A = Assists; Pts = Points; +/− = Plus/Minus; PIM = Penalties in Minutes; POS = Position
Source: IIHF.com

==== Goaltending leaders ====
Only the top five goaltenders, based on save percentage, who have played at least 40% of their team's minutes, are included in this list.

Player	TOI	GA	GAA	SA	Sv%	SO
(Romania) Attila Adorján	239:10	4	1.00	87	95.40	1
(China) Tu Yueran	196:23	6	1.83	108	94.44	1
(Estonia) Conrad Mölder	245:00	8	1.96	99	91.92	0
(Netherlands) Cedrick Andree	158:51	12	4.53	113	89.38	0
(South Korea) Lee Yeon-seung	238:35	12	3.02	97	87.63	0

TOI = time on ice (minutes:seconds); SA = shots against; GA = goals against; GAA = goals against average; Sv% = save percentage; SO = shutouts
Source: IIHF.com

=== Awards ===
Position	Player
Goaltender	(Romania) Attila Adorján
Defenceman	(China) Haoxi Wang
Forward	(Estonia) David Timofejev
