= Ice hockey at the 2026 Winter Olympics – Men's qualification =

Qualification for the men's ice hockey tournament at the 2026 Winter Olympics was determined by the IIHF World Ranking following the 2023 Men's Ice Hockey World Championships. A total of 12 men's hockey teams qualified. The hosts (Italy) along with the top eight teams in the world ranking received automatic berths into the Olympics, while all other teams had an opportunity to qualify for the remaining three spots.

== Qualified teams ==
Event	Date	Location	Vacancies	Qualified
Hosts	24 June 2019	(Switzerland) Lausanne	1	Italy
2023 IIHF World Ranking	2 June 2023	—N/a	7	Canada; Finland; United States; Germany; Sweden; Switzerland; Czech Republic
Final qualification tournaments	29 August – 1 September 2024	(Slovakia) Bratislava	1	Slovakia
Final qualification tournaments	29 August – 1 September 2024	(Latvia) Riga	2	Latvia; France
Final qualification tournaments	29 August – 1 September 2024	(Denmark) Aalborg	1	Denmark
Total			12	

Notes

1. ^{a} The 2023 IIHF World Ranking comprised the following events: 2020 World Championship, 2021 World Championship, 2022 Winter Olympic Games, 2022 World Championship and 2023 World Championship.
2. ^{b} Tampere and Riga were the sites of the 2023 IIHF World Championship; at the conclusion of the tournament the ranking and direct qualification slots were finalized.
3. ^{c} France replaced banned Russia both in the men's and women's tournament, filling the final seed in both.

== Qualification seeding ==
To qualify directly, a nation had to be ranked in the top eight following the 2023 Men's Ice Hockey World Championships. In the IIHF World Ranking system, ranking points from the most recent year were weighted at full value, and points from each preceding year were worth 25% less.

Qualified directly to Olympic tournament
Entered in Final Olympic qualification
Entered in Round 3
Entered in Round 2
Entered in Round 1 (cancelled)
Did not enter Olympic qualification

Qualifying seed	Team	WC2023 (100%)	WC2022 (75%)	OLY2022 (75%)	WC2021 (50%)	WC2020 (25%)	Total
1	Canada	1600	1160	1040	1200	1200	4150
2	Finland	1420	1200	1200	1160	1120	4080
3	Russia	1520	1120	1160	1060	1160	4050
4	United States	1500	1100	1060	1120	1040	3940
5	Germany	1560	1020	940	1100	1020	3835
6	Sweden	1440	1040	1100	960	1100	3800
7	Switzerland	1460	1060	1000	1040	1000	3775
8	Czechia	1400	1120	960	1020	1060	3735
9	Slovakia	1360	1000	1120	1000	960	3690
10	Latvia	1520	940	920	920	940	3610
11	Denmark	1340	960	1020	900	900	3500
12	Norway	1280	880	880	880	920	3270
13	France	1300	900	860	840	800	3240
14	Belarus	1260	860	840	840	880	3175
15	Kazakhstan	1320	860	700	940	840	3170
16	Austria	1260	920	800	780	780	3135
17	Slovenia	1220	800	820	740	740	2990
Host	Italy	1160	840	740	820	860	2970
18	Hungary	1240	780	780	720	720	2950
19	Great Britain	1200	820	660	860	820	2945
20	South Korea	1140	740	720	760	760	2805
21	Poland	1180	700	760	700	660	2790
22	Romania	1120	720	640	660	700	2645
23	Lithuania	1100	760	600	680	680	2630
24	Japan	1080	680	680	640	640	2580
25	China	1040	600	900	500	480	2535
26	Ukraine	1060	660	620	600	600	2470
27	Estonia	1020	640	580	620	620	2400
28	Netherlands	1000	580	560	580	560	2285
29	Serbia	980	620	500	560	580	2245
30	Croatia	920	560	540	540	540	2170
31	Spain	960	540	520	520	500	2140
	Israel	880	520	420	460	460	1950
32	Iceland	860	480	480	440	420	1925
	Australia	900	560	—	480	520	1710
33	Bulgaria	800	420	380	340	340	1655
34	Mexico	740	400	360	400	360	1600
35	Turkey	760	340	460	300	300	1585
36	United Arab Emirates	840	360	320	200	220	1505
	Belgium	820	440	—	420	440	1470
37	Chinese Taipei	720	300	440	240	240	1455
	New Zealand	780	440	—	360	400	1390
	Luxembourg	640	280	300	280	260	1280
38	Thailand	660	220	340	140	160	1190
	Turkmenistan	700	320	—	260	280	1140
39	Kyrgyzstan	600	160	400	100	100	1095
40	Hong Kong	560	220	280	180	180	1070
41	Bosnia and Herzegovina	580	200	260	160	140	1040
42	South Africa	680	240	—	220	200	1020
43	Kuwait	440	80	240	120	120	770
	Singapore	540	120	—	40	—	650
	Malaysia	500	100	—	80	80	635
44	Georgia	0	460	—	380	380	630
45	Iran	520	140	—	—	—	625
	Philippines	480	100	—	60	60	600
	North Korea	—	360	—	320	320	510
	Mongolia	460	—	—	—	—	460
	Indonesia	420	—	—	—	—	420

== Olympic qualification Round 1 ==
The round was cancelled. It was meant to be held between 8 and 12 November 2023, and consist of two groups of five teams. Teams entered in Group N were United Arab Emirates, Kyrgyzstan, Hong Kong, Kuwait and Georgia, while teams entered in Group O were Chinese Taipei, Thailand, Bosnia and Herzegovina, South Africa and Iran.

Chinese Taipei, Thailand and South Africa accepted invitations to compete in Round 2. Georgia also entered Round 2 after the withdrawal of Mexico.

== Olympic qualification Round 2 ==
Twelve countries played in three tournaments to determine qualifiers for the next round. The three tournament winners were ranked by their qualification seedings and entered the next round as qualifier seven, eight and nine.

=== Group K ===
Group K

Tournament details
- Host country: Iceland
- City: Reykjavík
- Venue: 1 (in 1 host city)
- Dates: 14–17 December
- Teams: 4

Tournament statistics
- Games played: 6
- Goals scored: 59 (9.83 per game)
- Attendance: 971 (162 per game)
- Scoring leader: (Estonia) Robert Arrak (15 points)

Official website
- IIHF

The Group K tournament was held in Reykjavík, Iceland, from 14 to 17 December 2023.

Pos	Team	Pld	W	OTW	OTL	L	GF	GA	GD	Pts	Qualification
1	Estonia	3	3	0	0	0	36	2	+34	9	Round 3
2	Iceland (H)	3	2	0	0	1	13	9	+4	6	
3	South Africa	3	1	0	0	2	6	19	−13	3	
4	Bulgaria	3	0	0	0	3	4	29	−25	0	

Source: IIHF
Rules for classification: 1) points; 2) head-to-head points; 3) head-to-head goal difference; 4) head-to-head number of goals scored; 5) result against closest best-ranked team outside tied teams; 6) result against second-best ranked team outside tied teams; 7) seeding before tournament.
(H) Host

All times are local (UTC±0).

14 December 2023; 15:30	Bulgaria	0–21 (0–3, 0–8, 0–10)	Estonia	Laugardalur Arena, Reykjavík; Attendance: 72

Game reference

Dimitar Dimitrov
Andrea Karabadjakov
Goalies
Villem-Henrik Koitmaa
Referees:
(Norway) Petter Bakken
(Serbia) Stefan Pozar
Linesmen:
(Lithuania) Karolis Janušauskas
(Croatia) Marko Saković

0–1	04:25 – Vasjonkin (Arrak, Reinsalu)
0–2	08:14 – Lovkov (Kookmaa)
0–3	Vasjonkin (Appelberg, Arrak)
0–4	24:02 – Romanov (Fedorovits, Reinsalu)
0–5	24:22 – Puzakov (Lovkov, Fursa)
0–6	25:32 – Koll (Novikov, Romanov)
0–7	27:24 – Arrak (Reinsalu, Ossipov)
0–8	28:05 – Kiik (Linde, Parras)
0–9	31:45 – Arrak (Kiik, Novikov)
0–10	34:29 – Fursa (Puzakov, Lovkov)
0–11	35:30 – Vasjonkin (Arrak, Appelberg)
0–12	41:28 – Appelberg (Arrak, Vasjonkin)
0–13	45:29 – Appelberg (Vasjonkin, Arrak)
0–14	46:46 – Fedorovits (Romanov, Koll)
0–15	48:07 – Kiik (Parras)
0–16	49:42 – Lovkov (Fursa, Puzakov)
0–17	52:25 – Vasjonkin (Arrak, Appelberg)
0–18	53:11 – Puzakov (Lovkov, Fursa)
0–19	56:51 – Fursa (Kookma, Lovkov)
0–20	57:48 – Romanov (Koll, Fedorovits)
0–21	59:23 – Kiik (Novikov, Kookmaa)

2 min
Penalties
2 min
15
Shots
71

14 December 2023; 19:00	Iceland	9–0 (3–0, 3–0, 3–0)	South Africa	Laugardalur Arena, Reykjavík; Attendance: 211

Game reference

Johan Ragnarsson
Goalies
Alistair Bywater
Referees:
(Sweden) Mikael Johansson
(Croatia) Trpimir Piragić
Linesmen:
(Norway) Knut Braten
(Iceland) Sindri Gunnarsson

Rúnarsson (B. Jóhannesson, Sverrisson) – 00:54	1–0
Magnusson (Leifsson) (PP) – 05:20	2–0
Arason – 15:05	3–0
Mikaelsson (Magnusson, Skúlason) – 25:13	4–0
Hafsteinsson (Blöndal) – 27:15	5–0
Jónsson (Runarsson, Hlynsson) – 39:40	6–0
B. Jóhannesson (SH) – 52:08	7–0
Hlynsson – 58:57	8–0
Hafsteinsson – 59:25	9–0

8 min
Penalties
6 min
47
Shots
9

15 December 2023; 15:30	Estonia	9–2 (1–1, 5–1, 3–0)	South Africa	Laugardalur Arena, Reykjavík; Attendance: 35

Game reference

Conrad Mölder
Goalies
Ryan Boyd
Referees:
(Norway) Peter Bakken
(Croatia) Trpimir Piragić
Linesmen:
(Iceland) Saemundur Leifsson
(Croatia) Marko Saković

Appelberg (Ossipov) – 13:08	1–0
	1–1	16:36 – Kluyts (Schuurman, Venter)
Appelberg – 21:15	2–1
Lahesalu (Laosma, Linde) – 25:51	3–1
Koll (Laosma, Romanov) – 27:39	4–1
Vasjonkin (Arrak, Novikov) – 29:07	5–1
Arrak (Vasjonkin) – 29:23	6–1
	6–2	39:53 – Giot (Carelse, Valadas) (PP)
Appelberg – 48:32	7–2
Appelberg (Vasjonkin)	8–2
Fursa (Puzakov, Lovkov) – 59:05	9–2

6 min
Penalties
8 min
76
Shots
12

15 December 2023; 19:00	Iceland	4–3 (1–0, 1–2, 2–1)	Bulgaria	Laugardalur Arena, Reykjavík; Attendance: 196

Game reference

Jakob Jóhannesson
Goalies
Dimitar Dimitrov
Referees:
(Sweden) Mikael Johansson
(Serbia) Stefan Pozar
Linesmen:
(Norway) Knut Braten
(Lithuania) Karolis Janušauskas

Magnusson (Kristjansson) (PP) – 06:05	1–0
	1–1	21:42 – Atanasov (K. Dikov)
	1–2	28:02 – Atanasov
Arnarsson (Hafsteinsson, Arason) – 39:34	2–2
	2–3	47:28 – K. Dikov (Hodulov) (PP2)
Blondal (Rúnarsson, Arnarsson) (EA) – 58:34	3–3
Rúnarsson (Hlysson) – 59:43	4–3

8 min
Penalties
18 min
68
Shots
13

17 December 2023; 15:30	South Africa	4–1 (0–0, 1–0, 3–1)	Bulgaria	Laugardalur Arena, Reykjavík; Attendance: 93

Game reference

Ryan Boyd
Goalies
Andrea Karabadjakov
Referees:
(Norway) Petter Bakken
(Serbia) Stefan Pozar
Linesmen:
(Iceland) Sindri Gunnarsson
(Iceland) Saemundur Leifsson

Valadas (Samaai) – 31:26	1–0
Valadas (Carelse) – 40:41	2–0
Phakathi – 47:07	3–0
Carelse (Valadas) (EN) – 56:04	4–0
	4–1	59:49 – Dilkov

6 min
Penalties
6 min
34
Shots
27

17 December 2023; 19:00	Estonia	6–0 (3–0, 2–0, 1–0)	Iceland	Laugardalur Arena, Reykjavík; Attendance: 364

Game reference

Villem-Henrik Koitmaa
Goalies
Johan Ragnarsson
Jakob Jóhannesson
Referees:
(Sweden) Mikael Johansson
(Croatia) Trpimir Piragić
Linesmen:
(Norway) Knut Braten
(Lithuania) Karolis Janušauskas

Arrak (Vasjonkin) – 00:51	1–0
Fedorovits (Romanov) – 02:47	2–0
Arrak (Vasjonkin, Appelberg) – 09:49	3–0
Lahesalu – 20:58	4–0
Arrak (Lahesalu, Appelberg) (PP) – 28:11	5–0
Arrak – 44:36	6–0

14 min
Penalties
8 min
44
Shots
25

=== Group L ===
Group L

Tournament details
- Host country: Netherlands
- City: Tilburg
- Venue: 1 (in 1 host city)
- Dates: 15–17 December
- Teams: 4

Tournament statistics
- Games played: 6
- Goals scored: 74 (12.33 per game)
- Attendance: 2,385 (398 per game)
- Scoring leader: (Netherlands) Danny Stempher (13 points)

Official website
- IIHF

The Group L tournament was held in Tilburg, Netherlands, from 15 to 17 December 2023. Mexico was entered into this group but withdrew and was replaced by Georgia.

Pos	Team	Pld	W	OTW	OTL	L	GF	GA	GD	Pts	Qualification
1	Spain	3	3	0	0	0	24	6	+18	9	Round 3
2	Netherlands (H)	3	2	0	0	1	34	7	+27	6	
3	Georgia	3	1	0	0	2	13	13	0	3	
4	Thailand	3	0	0	0	3	3	48	−45	0	

Source: IIHF
Rules for classification: 1) points; 2) head-to-head points; 3) head-to-head goal difference; 4) head-to-head number of goals scored; 5) result against closest best-ranked team outside tied teams; 6) result against second-best ranked team outside tied teams; 7) seeding before tournament.
(H) Host

All times are local (UTC+1).

15 December 2023; 16:30	Spain	15–2 (6–0, 6–2, 3–0)	Thailand	IJssportcentrum, Tilburg; Attendance: 150

Game reference

Raul Barbo
Sergi Reina
Goalies
Benjamin Kleineschay
Referees:
(Republic of Ireland) Vytautas Lukosevicius
(Germany) Nikolas Neutzer
Linesmen:
(Bulgaria) Martin Boyadjiev
(Netherlands) Jeroen Klijberg

Rubio (González) (PP) – 04:40	1–0
Granell (González, De Bonilla) (PP) – 09:36	2–0
Granell (Hernández) – 12:29	3–0
Capillas (Burgos, Torralba) – 16:40	4–0
Granell (Hernández)	5–0
– 17:30	6–0
Donath (Muratet) – 17:39	7–0
Muratet (García) (PP) – 22:28	8–0
Carbonell (Burgos) (PP2) – 24:30	9–0
Hernández (García) (PP) – 25:19	10–0
	10–1	31:21 – Lampson (Kitayama, Isaksson)
González (Carbonall, De Bonilla) (PP) – 27:17	11–1
	11–2	36:47 – Lampson
Carbonell (Rubio, Encinar) – 33:27	12–2
Hernández (Donath) – 46:59	13–2
Zaballa (Rubio) – 48:40	14–2
Donath (O'Hare) – 54:18	15–2

6 min
Penalties
41 min
41
Shots
9

15 December 2023; 20:00	Netherlands	8–2 (2–1, 2–1, 4–0)	Georgia	IJssportcentrum, Tilburg; Attendance: 416

Game reference

Matijn Oosterwijk
Goalies
Mikhail Fofanov
Referees:
(Belgium) Niki De Herdt
(Czech Republic) Roman Mrkva
Linesmen:
(Estonia) Savva Azarov
(Spain) Carlos Trobajo

De Hondt (Stempher) (PP) – 06:17	1–0
De Bonth (Hessels) – 12:35	2–0
	2–1	13:42 – Kireev
Stempher (De Hondt) – 30:11	3–1
	3–2	35:31 – Dziov (Kochkin)
Bison (Hofland) (SH) – 38:13	4–2
De Bonth (Hofland, Borgman) – 40:45	5–2
Muller (Verkiel) (PP) – 44:31	6–2
Van Nes (Gerretsen, De Hondt) – 50:38	7–2
Stempher (Van Nes) – 58:04	8–2

8 min
Penalties
12 min
50
Shots
10

16 December 2023; 16:30	Thailand	1–23 (1–6, 0–7, 0–10)	Netherlands	IJssportcentrum, Tilburg; Attendance: 565

Game reference

Benjamin Kleineschay
Pattarapol Ungkulpattanasuk
Goalies
Matijn Oosterwijk
Referees:
(Belgium) Niki De Herdt
(Germany) Nikolas Neutzer
Linesmen:
(Estonia) Savva Azarov
(Bulgaria) Martin Boyadjiev

	0–1	03:23 – Verkiel (Stempher, De Hondt)
	0–2	04:40 – De Bonth (Stempher, Hofland)
	0–3	12:06 – De Hondt (Stempher)
Thanakroekkiat (Forstner, Kindborn) (PP) – 13:11	1–3
	1–4	15:14 – Van Nes (De Hondt, Stempher)
	1–5	15:23 – Bison (Timmer, Oosterveld) (SH)
	1–6	17:01 – Hofland (De Bonth)
	1–7	20:57 – Stempher (De Hondt) (SH)
	1–8	27:04 – Bison (Verkiel) (PP)
	1–9	27:41 – Nordemann (Doop, Huisman)
	1–10	28:25 – Timmer (Verkiel, Bison) (PP)
	1–11	32:21 – De Bonth (Stempher, Hofland)
	1–12	33:30 – Van Elten (Huisman)
	1–13	34:55 – Borgman (Van Nes, Stempher)
	1–14	40:51 – Verkiel
	1–15	43:16 – Huisman (De Ruiter, Van Elten)
	1–16	45:56 – Timmer (Nordemann, Bison)
	1–17	48:17 – Stempher (Van Nes, Gerretsen)
	1–18	48:59 – Huisman (Van Gorp, Hofland)
	1–19	52:48 – Nordemann
	1–20	53:31 – De Hondt (Stempher, Van Gorp) (PP)
	1–21	53:43 – De Bonth (Hofland, Borgman)
	1–22	58:07 – De Ruiter (Doop, Gerretsen)
	1–23	58:16 – Timmer

10 min
Penalties
4 min
7
Shots
76

16 December 2023; 20:00	Spain	5–1 (1–0, 3–1, 1–0)	Georgia	IJssportcentrum, Tilburg; Attendance: 222

Game reference

Raul Barbo
Goalies
Ivan Starostin
Referees:
(Republic of Ireland) Vytautas Lukosevicius
(Czech Republic) Roman Mrkva
Linesmen:
(Netherlands) Jeroen Klijberg
(Netherlands) Bram Zwarthoed

Torralba (De Bonilla, O'Hare) – 16:02	1–0
O'Hare (Burgos, Baldris) (PP) – 24:31	2–0
Baldris (Burgos, O'Hare) (PP) – 29:22	3–0
	3–1	31:20 – Kozyulin (Dziov, Obolgogiani) (PP)
González (Carbonell) – 36:00	4–1
Donath (Zaballa) (SH) – 53:18	5–1

14 min
Penalties
12 min
34
Shots
8

17 December 2023; 16:30	Netherlands	3–4 (1–0, 2–3, 0–1)	Spain	IJssportcentrum, Tilburg; Attendance: 857

Game reference

Cedrick Andree
Goalies
Raul Barbo
Referees:
(Czech Republic) Roman Mrkva
(Germany) Nikolas Neutzer
Linesmen:
(Bulgaria) Martin Boyadjiev
(Netherlands) Jeroen Klijberg

Stempher (Borgman, Van Nes (PP) – 19:03	1–0
	1–1	21:23 – González (García)
	1–2	29:23 – Burgos (O'Hare) (PP)
	1–3	32:09 – Donath
Van Nes (De Ruiter, Van Gorp) – 35:02	2–3
Huisman (Borgman, Van Gorp) – 36:53	3–3
	3–4	47:39 – Baldris (Burgos, O'Hare) (PP)

6 min
Penalties
12 min
30
Shots
21

17 December 2023; 20:00	Georgia	10–0 (3–0, 4–0, 3–0)	Thailand	IJssportcentrum, Tilburg; Attendance: 175

Game reference

Ivan Starostin
Mikhail Fofanov
Goalies
Benjamin Kleineschay
Referees:
(Belgium) Niki De Herdt
(Republic of Ireland) Vytautas Lukosevicius
Linesmen:
(Spain) Carlos Trobajo
(Netherlands) Bram Zwarthoed

Kurbatov (Vasilchenko) – 08:07	1–0
Dziov (Romanov, Marov) – 10:18	2–0
Romanov (Kochkin, Bukiya) (PP) – 19:05	3–0
Romanov (Ermoshenko, Dziov) – 21:42	4–0
Dziov (Bukiya) – 26:28	5–0
Obolgogiani (Bukiya, Kurbatov) – 29:46	6–0
Kochkin (Dziov) – 34:20	7–0
Kurbatov (Kochkin, Romanov) (PP) – 53:25	8–0
Kharizov (Vasilchenko, Kurbatov) – 53:57	9–0
Bukiya – 59:53	10–0

10 min
Penalties
10 min
36
Shots
15

=== Group M ===
Group M

Tournament details
- Host country: Serbia
- City: Belgrade
- Venue: 1 (in 1 host city)
- Dates: 14–17 December
- Teams: 4

Tournament statistics
- Games played: 6
- Goals scored: 34 (5.67 per game)
- Attendance: 1,335 (223 per game)
- Scoring leader: (Croatia) Jan Smolec (6 points)

Official website
- IIHF

The Group M tournament was held in Belgrade, Serbia, from 14 to 17 December 2023.

Pos	Team	Pld	W	OTW	OTL	L	GF	GA	GD	Pts	Qualification
1	Serbia (H)	3	3	0	0	0	15	0	+15	9	Round 3
2	Croatia	3	2	0	0	1	12	7	+5	6	
3	Chinese Taipei	3	1	0	0	2	4	13	−9	3	
4	Turkey	3	0	0	0	3	3	14	−11	0	

Source: IIHF
Rules for classification: 1) points; 2) head-to-head points; 3) head-to-head goal difference; 4) head-to-head number of goals scored; 5) result against closest best-ranked team outside tied teams; 6) result against second-best ranked team outside tied teams; 7) seeding before tournament.
(H) Host

All times are local (UTC+1).

14 December 2023; 15:30	Croatia	6–1 (0–0, 3–0, 3–1)	Chinese Taipei	Pionir Ice Hall, Belgrade; Attendance: 17

Game reference

Ivan Ružić
Goalies
Hsiao Pu-yu
Referees:
(Slovakia) Michal Klejna
(Poland) Paweł Kosidło
Linesmen:
(Serbia) Aleksandar Đokić
(Iceland) Oli Gunnarsson

Vedlin (Smolec) (PP) – 25:50	1–0
Idžan (Smolec, Fičur) (PP) – 32:26	2–0
Bebek (Puzić, Čanić) – 39:01	3–0
Vedlin (Fičur) – 56:01	4–0
Mirić (Fičur, Cavlović) – 56:32	5–0
Dobrić (Smolec) – 57:04	6–0
	6–1	58:38 – Yang (Lin H., Lin Y.c.)

10 min
Penalties
12 min
62
Shots
12

14 December 2023; 19:00	Serbia	5–0 (1–0, 1–0, 3–0)	Turkey	Pionir Ice Hall, Belgrade; Attendance: 367

Game reference

Arsenije Ranković
Goalies
Tolga Bozacı
Referees:
(Hungary) Daniel Rencz
(United Kingdom) Joe Sewell
Linesmen:
(Austria) Christoph Barnthaler
(Netherlands) Lodewijk Beelen

M. Mladenović (Racić, Gvozdenović) – 08:28	1–0
Racić (Anić, Dragović) – 33:47	2–0
Vučurević (Podunavac) – 50:38	3–0
Podunavac (Subotić) – 52:56	4–0
Podunavac (Novaković, Mitrović) – 57:21	5–0

2 min
Penalties
4 min
39
Shots
17

15 December 2023; 15:30	Croatia	6–2 (0–1, 3–1, 3–0)	Turkey	Pionir Ice Hall, Belgrade; Attendance: 14

Game reference

Vito Nikolić
Goalies
Tolga Bozacı
Referees:
(Poland) Paweł Kosidło
(Hungary) Daniel Rencz
Linesmen:
(Austria) Christoph Barnthaler
(Serbia) David Perduv

	0–1	19:01 – Bakal (Bingöl, Savaş) (PP)
	0–2	25:33 – Meydanci (Solak)
Vedlin (Puzić) (SH) – 27:22	1–2
Smolec (Novotny) (SH) – 28:15	2–2
Smolec (Idžan) – 38:33	3–2
Puzić (Čanić, Dobrić) – 44:45	4–2
Idžan (Čanić, Smolec) (PP2) – 52:10	5–2
Dimitrijević (Fičur) – 57:51	6–2

33 min
Penalties
10 min
28
Shots
12

15 December 2023; 19:00	Chinese Taipei	0–6 (0–3, 0–1, 0–2)	Serbia	Pionir Ice Hall, Belgrade; Attendance: 428

Game reference

Li Yi-cheng
Goalies
Arsenije Ranković
Lazar Ilić
Referees:
(Slovakia) Michal Klejna
(United Kingdom) Joe Sewell
Linesmen:
(Netherlands) Lodewijk Beelen
(Iceland) Oli Gunnarsson

0–1	10:28 – Racić (Subotić)
0–2	14:13 – Dinić (Podunavac, Dragović)
0–3	19:47 – M. Mladenović (Zwick)
0–4	34:54 – Vučurević (K. Mladenović, Zwick)
0–5	47:36 – M. Mladenović (Kravljanac, Španjević)
0–6	56:30 – Zwick (PS, SH)

6 min
Penalties
11 min
22
Shots
42

17 December 2023; 15:30	Turkey	1–3 (0–1, 1–2, 0–0)	Chinese Taipei	Pionir Ice Hall, Belgrade; Attendance: 21

Game reference

Oğulcan Kızılkaya
Goalies
Hsiao Po-yu
Referees:
(Poland) Paweł Kosidło
(United Kingdom) Joe Sewell
Linesmen:
(Serbia) Aleksandar Đokić
(Serbia) David Perduv

	0–1	04:50 – Lin J. (Lin Y.k., Shen)
Meydancı (Solak) – 21:19	1–1
	1–2	26:06 – Lin Y.c. (Lin H., Sang) (PP)
	1–3	31:58 – Lin H. (SH)

10 min
Penalties
4 min
31
Shots
28

17 December 2023; 19:00	Serbia	4–0 (1–0, 0–0, 3–0)	Croatia	Pionir Ice Hall, Belgrade; Attendance: 488

Game reference

Arsenije Ranković
Goalies
Vito Nikolić
Referees:
(Slovakia) Michal Klejna
(Hungary) Daniel Rencz
Linesmen:
(Austria) Christoph Barnthaler
(Netherlands) Lodewijk Beelen

Novaković (Dragović) (PP2) – 15:44	1–0
Racić (M. Mladenović) – 41:16	2–0
Španjević (Vučurević) (PP) – 55:47	3–0
Dinić (Podunavac, Dragović) – 57:15	4–0

8 min
Penalties
12 min
26
Shots
24

== Olympic qualification Round 3 ==
Twelve countries played in three tournaments to determine qualifiers for the next round. Each tournament winner was ranked by their qualification seeding and entered the next round as qualifier four, five, or six. The tournaments were played between 8 and 11 February 2024.

=== Group G ===
Group G

Tournament details
- Host country: Hungary
- City: Budapest
- Venue: 1 (in 1 host city)
- Dates: 8–10 February
- Teams: 4

Tournament statistics
- Games played: 6
- Goals scored: 42 (7 per game)
- Attendance: 5,659 (943 per game)
- Scoring leader: (Hungary) János Hári (6 points)

Official website
- IIHF

The tournament was held in Budapest, Hungary.

Pos	Team	Pld	W	OTW	OTL	L	GF	GA	GD	Pts	Qualification
1	Japan	3	3	0	0	0	14	8	+6	9	Final qualification
2	Hungary (H)	3	2	0	0	1	15	6	+9	6	Final qualification
3	Lithuania	3	1	0	0	2	7	13	−6	3	
4	Spain	3	0	0	0	3	6	15	−9	0	

Source: IIHF
Rules for classification: 1) points; 2) head-to-head points; 3) head-to-head goal difference; 4) head-to-head number of goals scored; 5) result against closest best-ranked team outside tied teams; 6) result against second-best ranked team outside tied teams; 7) seeding before tournament.
(H) Host

All times are local (UTC+1).

8 February 2024; 15:00	Lithuania	4–6 (2–0, 1–3, 1–3)	Japan	Tüskecsarnok, Budapest; Attendance: 77

Game reference

Elvinas Karla
Goalies
Yuta Narisawa
Referees:
(Poland) Michał Baca
(Latvia) Emīls Druseiks
Linesmen:
(Hungary) Barna Kis-Király
(Finland) Luka Mäkinen

Kaleinikovas (Ališauskas) – 00:14	1–0
Noreika (Kaleinikovas, Gintautas) (PP) – 10:28	2–0
Krakauskas (Bendžius) – 24:30	3–0
	3–1	29:41 – Isogai (Otsu, T. Nakajima)
	3–2	29:58 – K. Sato (Irikura)
	3–3	38:05 – Hirano (Minoshima, Ishida)
	3–4	43:34 – T. Nakajima (S. Nakajima) (PP)
	3–5	47:57 – Takagi (Halliday)
	3–6	54:33 – K. Sato
Gintautas (Krakauskas) – 58:55	4–6

4 min
Penalties
10 min
32
Shots
39

8 February 2024; 18:00	Hungary	7–3 (3–0, 3–0, 1–3)	Spain	Tüskecsarnok, Budapest; Attendance: 1,453

Game reference

Ádám Vay
Goalies
Raul Barbo
Referees:
(Czech Republic) Roman Mrvka
(Slovenia) Gregor Režek
Linesmen:
(Lithuania) Aleksej Sascenkov
(Sweden) Andreas Svensson

Mihály (Terbócs, Hadobás) – 01:44	1–0
Mihály (Sofron) – 07:51	2–0
Galló (Hári, Erdély) – 18:30	3–0
Galló (Erdély, Hári) – 23:38	4–0
Stipsicz (Sebők) – 36:11	5–0
Fejes (Hári, Galló) – 39:37	6–0
	6–1	42:20 – Donath (Encinar, Ferrández)
	6–2	45:41 – Capillas (Baldris) (PP)
Terbócs (Nagy) – 58:07	7–2
	7–3	58:15 – Donath (O'Hare)

2 min
Penalties
6 min
37
Shots
18

9 February 2024; 16:30	Spain	3–6 (2–0, 0–3, 1–3)	Japan	Tüskecsarnok, Budapest; Attendance: 116

Game reference

Marco Hernández
Goalies
Eiki Sato
Yuta Narisawa
Referees:
(Czech Republic) Roman Mrvka
(Finland) Janne Wuorenheimo
Linesmen:
(Hungary) Barna Kis-Király
(Lithuania) Aleksej Sascenkov

Capillas (Guerra, De Bonilla) – 01:26	1–0
O'Hare (Baldris) – 05:50	2–0
	2–1	28:52 – S. Nakajima (Yoneyama)
	2–2	33:37 – Hitosato (Takagi, Irikura)
	2–3	37:49 – Yamada (Suzuki, Ishida)
	2–4	45:12 – K. Sato (H. Sato, Irikura)
Torralba (Burgos, Capillas) – 46:21	3–4
	3–5	54:55 – Yamada (Irikura, Nakayashiki)
	3–6	59:00 – Ishida (Yamada, Irikura) (EA)

2 min
Penalties
27 min
20
Shots
41

9 February 2024; 20:00	Hungary	7–1 (4–1, 0–0, 3–0)	Lithuania	Tüskecsarnok, Budapest; Attendance: 1,907

Game reference

Bence Bálizs
Goalies
Elvinas Karla
Referees:
(Poland) Michał Baca
(Slovenia) Gregor Režek
Linesmen:
(Sweden) Andreas Svensson
(France) Quentin Ugolini

	0–1	08:15 – Kaleinikovas (PP)
Galló (Stipsicz, Fejes) – 10:08	1–1
Mihály (Terbócs, Sebők) – 13:33	2–1
Nemes (Terbócs, Németh) – 16:14	3–1
Hári (Erdély) – 18:41	4–1
Hári – 46:48	5–1
Sofron (Hári, Galló) (PP) – 54:47	6–1
Kiss (Ortenszky, Sebők) – 56:30	7–1

10 min
Penalties
4 min
44
Shots
18

10 February 2024; 16:30	Lithuania	2–0 (1–0, 1–0, 0–0)	Spain	Tüskecsarnok, Budapest; Attendance: 177

Game reference
Elvinas Karla	Goalies	Raul Barbo	Referees: (Latvia) Emīls Druseiks (Slovenia) Gregor Režek; Linesmen: (Hungary) Barna Kis-Király (Lithuania) Aleksej Sascenkov
Dumcius (Noreika, Četvertak) – 16:26 / 1–0; Čižas (Gusevas, Kaleinikovas) – 26:23 / 2–0			Referees: (Latvia) Emīls Druseiks (Slovenia) Gregor Režek; Linesmen: (Hungary) Barna Kis-Király (Lithuania) Aleksej Sascenkov
8 min	Penalties	4 min	Referees: (Latvia) Emīls Druseiks (Slovenia) Gregor Režek; Linesmen: (Hungary) Barna Kis-Király (Lithuania) Aleksej Sascenkov
22	Shots	32	Referees: (Latvia) Emīls Druseiks (Slovenia) Gregor Režek; Linesmen: (Hungary) Barna Kis-Király (Lithuania) Aleksej Sascenkov

10 February 2024; 20:00	Japan	2–1 (0–0, 0–1, 2–0)	Hungary	Tüskecsarnok, Budapest; Attendance: 1,929

Game reference

Yuta Narisawa
Goalies
Bence Bálizs
Referees:
(Czech Republic) Roman Mrvka
(Finland) Janne Wuorenheimo
Linesmen:
(Finland) Luka Mäkinen
(France) Quentin Ugolini

	0–1	36:51 – Sofron (Stipsicz, Erdély) (PP)
S. Nakajima (Hirano) (PP) – 43:32	1–1
Halliday (Suzuki, Osawa) – 45:34	2–1

12 min
Penalties
12 min
20
Shots
37

=== Group H ===
Group H

Tournament details
- Host country: Great Britain
- City: Cardiff
- Venue: 1 (in 1 host city)
- Dates: 8–11 February
- Teams: 4

Tournament statistics
- Games played: 6
- Goals scored: 56 (9.33 per game)
- Attendance: 8,537 (1,423 per game)
- Scoring leader(s): (United Kingdom) Liam Kirk (United Kingdom) Cade Neilson (10 points)

Official website
- IIHF

The tournament was held in Cardiff, Great Britain.

Pos	Team	Pld	W	OTW	OTL	L	GF	GA	GD	Pts	Qualification
1	Great Britain (H)	3	3	0	0	0	28	5	+23	9	Final qualification
2	Romania	3	2	0	0	1	14	8	+6	6	
3	China	3	1	0	0	2	9	21	−12	3	
4	Serbia	3	0	0	0	3	5	22	−17	0	

Source: IIHF
Rules for classification: 1) points; 2) head-to-head points; 3) head-to-head goal difference; 4) head-to-head number of goals scored; 5) result against closest best-ranked team outside tied teams; 6) result against second-best ranked team outside tied teams; 7) seeding before tournament.
(H) Host

All times are local (UTC+0).

8 February 2024; 16:00	Romania	4–0 (0–0, 3–0, 1–0)	Serbia	Ice Arena Wales, Cardiff; Attendance: 352

Game reference

Zoltán Tőke
Goalies
Arsenije Ranković
Referees:
(Denmark) Kenneth Nielsen
(Sweden) Alexander Österberg
Linesmen:
(Netherlands) Lodewijk Beelen
(United Kingdom) Daniel Beresford

Skachkov (Péter, Haaranen) (PP) – 20:44	1–0
Bors (S. Rokaly) – 32:12	2–0
Farkas (Részegh, Skachkov) – 39:30	3–0
Skachkov (Rokaly, Részegh) – 42:58	4–0

2 min
Penalties
8 min
32
Shots
17

8 February 2024; 20:00	Great Britain	10–1 (2–0, 5–0, 3–1)	China	Ice Arena Wales, Cardiff; Attendance: 1,860

Game reference

Ben Bowns
Goalies
Sun Zehao
Referees:
(Poland) Krzysztof Kozłowski
(Czech Republic) Robin Šír
Linesmen:
(France) Clément Goncalves
(Finland) Joni Pekkala

Kirk (Dowd, Neilson) – 03:32	1–0
Richardson (Lake, Curran) – 16:45	2–0
Kirk (Halbert, Neilson) – 25:53	3–0
Critchlow (Norris, Lachowicz) – 27:02	4–0
Critchlow (Lachowicz) – 30:07	5–0
Curran (Lake, Phillips) – 32:53	6–0
Neilson (Kirk, Halbert) (PP) – 38:39	7–0
Dowd (Neilson, Richardson) – 43:34	8–0
	8–1	43:47 – Zuo
Davies (Kirk, Jones) – 56:12	9–1
Halbert – 58:53	10–1

2 min
Penalties
8 min
47
Shots
10

10 February 2024; 15:00	Romania	6–1 (1–1, 1–0, 4–0)	China	Ice Arena Wales, Cardiff; Attendance: 420

Game reference

Attila Adorján
Goalies
Sun Zehao
Referees:
(Denmark) Kenneth Nielsen
(Slovakia) Michal Kleijna
Linesmen:
(United Kingdom) Daniel Beresford
(Norway) Herman Johansen

	0–1	11:05 – Wang J. (Chen Z.)
Imre (Péter) (SH) – 05:37	1–1
Részegh (Péter) (SH) – 20:29	2–1
Sándor-Székely (N. Rokaly, Gajdó) – 42:08	3–1
Teamriuc – 50:38	4–1
Gajdó (N. Rokaly, Sándor-Székely) – 57:40	5–1
Kovács (Cășăneanu) – 58:06	6–1

6 min
Penalties
4 min
37
Shots
11

10 February 2024; 19:00	Serbia	0–11 (0–1, 0–8, 0–2)	Great Britain	Ice Arena Wales, Cardiff; Attendance: 2,900

Game reference

Arsenije Ranković
Lazar Ilić
Goalies
Jackson Whistle
Referees:
(Sweden) Alexander Österberg
(Czech Republic) Robin Šír
Linesmen:
(Netherlands) Lodewijk Beelen
(France) Clément Goncalves

0–1	03:20 – Dowd (Halbert)
0–2	20:57 – Perlini (Kirk)
0–3	23:46 – Dowd (Kirk, Richardson)
0–4	26:14 – Shudra (O'Connor, Davies)
0–5	30:37 – Dowd (Neilson)
0–6	32:01 – Critchlow (Lachowicz)
0–7	34:37 – B. Whistle (Davies, Shudra)
0–8	35:39 – Perlini (Mosey, Norris)
0–9	37:31 – Jones (Davies, Kirk)
0–10	40:29 – Halbert (Neilson, Kirk)
0–11	45:01 – Neilson (Dowd, Richardson)

6 min
Penalties
4 min
12
Shots
71

11 February 2024; 19:00	China	7–5 (3–2, 0–2, 4–1)	Serbia	Ice Arena Wales, Cardiff; Attendance: 368

Game reference

Sun Zehao
Goalies
Arsenije Ranković
Referees:
(Slovakia) Michal Kleijna
(Poland) Krzysztof Kozłowski
Linesmen:
(United Kingdom) Daniel Beresford
(France) Clément Goncalves

	0–1	11:28 – Podunavac (Subotić)
	0–2	13:36 – Dragović (SH)
Zheng (Wang J.) – 16:44	1–2
Zhang Z. (PS) – 17:17	2–2
Guo (Zhang Y.) – 19:48	3–2
	3–3	29:13 – Dragović (PP)
	3–4	37:08 – Leštarić (Racić, Dragović)
Yan – 40:42	4–4
Zhang P. (Hou, Wang J.) – 41:11	5–4
Zong (Wang J.) – 50:01	6–4
	6–5	53:36 – Mladenović (Tomašević, Dragović)
Guo (Zheng) (EN) – 58:48	7–5

8 min
Penalties
8 min
34
Shots
21

11 February 2024; 19:00	Great Britain	7–4 (2–1, 3–1, 2–2)	Romania	Ice Arena Wales, Cardiff; Attendance: 2,637

Game reference

Ben Bowns
Goalies
Zoltán Tőke
Referees:
(Sweden) Alexander Österberg
(Czech Republic) Robin Šír
Linesmen:
(Norway) Herman Johansen
(Finland) Joni Pekkala

Perlini (Lake) – 08:07	1–0
	1–1	08:29 – Sándor-Székely (Gajdó, N. Rokaly)
Lake (O'Connor, Jones) – 18:17	2–1
Perlini (Lake, O'Connor) – 22:04	3–1
	3–2	28:21 – Skachkov (N. Rokaly, S. Rokaly) (PP)
Jones (Neilson, Kirk) – 36:44	4–2
Ruopp (Norris, Mosey) – 37:32	5–2
Kirk (Dowd, Neilson) – 44:32	6–2
	6–3	45:30 – Gecse (Zagidullin, Péter)
Neilson (Dowd) – 47:06	7–3
	7–4	55:50 – Haaranen (S. Rokaly) (PP)

33 min
Penalties
31 min
40
Shots
22

=== Group J ===
Group J

Tournament details
- Host country: Poland
- City: Sosnowiec
- Venue: 1 (in 1 host city)
- Dates: 8–11 February
- Teams: 4

Tournament statistics
- Games played: 6
- Goals scored: 32 (5.33 per game)
- Attendance: 4,771 (795 per game)
- Scoring leader: (South Korea) Hong Jung-wook (4 points)

Official website
- IIHF

The tournament was held in Sosnowiec, Poland.

Pos	Team	Pld	W	OTW	OTL	L	GF	GA	GD	Pts	Qualification
1	Ukraine	3	2	1	0	0	12	5	+7	8	Final qualification
2	South Korea	3	1	1	0	1	7	8	−1	5 (Note: South Korea 3–2 Poland)	
3	Poland (H)	3	1	0	2	0	8	6	+2	5	
4	Estonia	3	0	0	0	3	5	13	−8	0	

Source: IIHF
Rules for classification: 1) points; 2) head-to-head points; 3) head-to-head goal difference; 4) head-to-head number of goals scored; 5) result against closest best-ranked team outside tied teams; 6) result against second-best ranked team outside tied teams; 7) seeding before tournament.
(H) Host
Notes:

All times are local (UTC+1).

8 February 2024; 16:30	Poland	4–0 (0–0, 2–0, 2–0)	Estonia	Zagłębiowski Park Sportowy, Sosnowiec; Attendance: 930

Game reference

David Zabolotny
Goalies
Villem-Henrik Koitmaa
Referees:
(Slovakia) Martin Jobbágy
(Spain) Alexey Roshchyn
Linesmen:
(Romania) Attila André
(Hungary) Norbert Muzsik

Komorski (Michalski, Zieliński) – 27:35	1–0
Michalski (Kolusz, Zieliński) – 31:02	2–0
Paś (Jaśkiewicz, Ciura) – 41:22	3–0
Wanacki (Kolusz) – 59:07	4–0

4 min
Penalties
6 min
33
Shots
11

8 February 2024; 20:00	South Korea	0–4 (0–1, 0–1, 0–2)	Ukraine	Zagłębiowski Park Sportowy, Sosnowiec; Attendance: 231

Game reference

Lee Yeon-seung
Ha Jung-ho
Goalies
Eduard Zakharchenko
Referees:
(Poland) Paweł Kosidło
(Germany) Nikolas Neutzer
Linesmen:
(Slovakia) Tomáš Gegáň
(Poland) Andrzej Nenko

0–1	14:10 – Mazur (Lialka, Morozov)
0–2	22:10 – Vorona (Borodai, Kutsevych)
0–3	49:31 – Denyskin (Pangelov-Yulda, Vorona)
0–4	50:03 – Trakht (Peresunko, Merezhko) (PP)

2 min
Penalties
8 min
31
Shots
22

9 February 2024; 16:30	Estonia	2–4 (1–1, 0–1, 1–2)	South Korea	Zagłębiowski Park Sportowy, Sosnowiec; Attendance: 251

Game reference

Lee Yeon-seung
Goalies
Henrik Virro
Referees:
(Slovakia) Martin Jobbágy
(Hungary) Dániel Rencz
Linesmen:
(Hungary) Norbert Muzsik
(Poland) Andrzej Nenko

Lovkov (Kulintsev, Luht) – 09:33	1–0
	1–1	11:59 – Nam (Kim Sang-w.)
	1–2	20:21 – Lee Cong-m. (Hong)
	1–3	48:11 – Ahn (Hong, Nam) (PP)
Vitanen (Rooba) (PP) – 49:44	2–3
	2–4	50:42 – Shin (Kim Sang-w.)

8 min
Penalties
4 min
21
Shots
43

9 February 2024; 20:15	Poland	2–3 GWS (1–0, 1–1, 0–1) (OT: 0–0) (SO: 0–1)	Ukraine	Zagłębiowski Park Sportowy, Sosnowiec; Attendance: 1,817

Game reference

Maciej Miarka
Goalies
Bogdan Dyachenko
Referees:
(Germany) Nikolas Neutzer
(Spain) Alexey Roshchyn
Linesmen:
(Slovakia) Tomáš Gegáň
(Netherlands) Jeroen Klijberg

Górny (Fraszko, Pasiut) – 07:15	1–0
	1–1	22:22 – Borodai (Hrebenyk, Korenchuk)
Kolusz (Dziubiński, Jeziorski) – 33:45	2–1
	2–2	43:43 – Ratushny (Korenchuk, Cholach)

Dziubiński
Fraszko (miss)
Wałęga (miss)
Kolusz (miss)
Pasiut (miss)
Shootout
(miss) Peresunko
(miss) Trakht
Korenchuk
Vorona
6 min
Penalties
2 min
34
Shots
32

11 February 2024; 16:30	Ukraine	5–3 (3–0, 1–2, 1–1)	Estonia	Zagłębiowski Park Sportowy, Sosnowiec; Attendance: 441

Game reference

Bogdan Dyachenko
Goalies
Villem-Henrik Koitmaa
Referees:
(Poland) Paweł Kosidło
(Hungary) Dániel Rencz
Linesmen:
(Romania) Attila André
(Slovakia) Tomáš Gegáň

Mazur (Merezhko, Trakht) (PP) – 02:29	1–0
Pangelov-Yulda (Denyskin, Hrebenyk) – 15:59	2–0
Lialka – 17:17	3–0
	3–1	23:29 – Arrak (Fursa, Rooba)
Fadyeyev (Peresunko, Ratushny) – 24:33	4–1
	4–2	26:41 – Vasjonkin (Vitanen)
	4–3	55:53 – Vitanen
Peresunko (Lialka) – 57:40	5–3

6 min
Penalties
4 min
21
Shots
24

11 February 2024; 20:15	South Korea	3–2 OT (0–0, 1–0, 1–2) (OT: 1–0)	Poland	Zagłębiowski Park Sportowy, Sosnowiec; Attendance: 1,101

Game reference

Lee Yeon-seung
Goalies
David Zabolotny
Referees:
(Slovakia) Martin Jobbágy
(Germany) Nikolas Neutzer
Linesmen:
(Netherlands) Jeroen Klijberg
(Hungary) Norbert Muzsik

Hong (Lee Cong-m.) – 35:08	1–0
	1–1	47:30 – Paś (Zygmunt)
Hong (PS) – 49:35	2–1
	2–2	50:02 – Wanacki (Dziubiński, Dronia)
Song (Kim Sang-w., Shin) – 63:58	3–2

2 min
Penalties
4 min
31
Shots
39

== Final Olympic qualification ==
Twelve countries played in three tournaments to determine the qualifying teams for the Olympic tournament. The tournaments were played between 29 August and 1 September 2024. On February 12, 2024, the IIHF announced that Belarus was disqualified from Olympic qualification forcing the redrawing of the final round and admitting the best second place finisher from the previous round, Hungary.

Russia was likewise not allowed to participate in the Olympic tournament, so France took its place as the best-ranked second place team from the earlier round.

=== Group D ===
Group D

Tournament details
- Host country: Slovakia
- City: Bratislava
- Venue: 1 (in 1 host city)
- Dates: 29 August – 1 September 2024
- Teams: 4

Tournament statistics
- Games played: 6
- Goals scored: 34 (5.67 per game)
- Attendance: 28,236 (4,706 per game)
- Scoring leader: (Kazakhstan) Nikita Mikhailis (4 points)

Official website
- IIHF

The tournament was held in Bratislava, Slovakia.

Pos	Team	Pld	W	OTW	OTL	L	GF	GA	GD	Pts	Qualification
1	Slovakia (H)	3	3	0	0	0	12	5	+7	9	2026 Winter Olympics
2	Kazakhstan	3	2	0	0	1	8	6	+2	6	
3	Austria	3	0	1	0	2	6	7	−1	2	
4	Hungary	3	0	0	1	2	8	16	−8	1	

Source: IIHF
Rules for classification: 1) points; 2) head-to-head points; 3) head-to-head goal difference; 4) head-to-head number of goals scored; 5) result against closest best-ranked team outside tied teams; 6) result against second-best ranked team outside tied teams; 7) seeding before tournament.
(H) Host

All times are local (UTC+2).

29 August 2024; 14:00	Kazakhstan	5–2 (1–0, 2–2, 2–0)	Hungary	Ondrej Nepela Arena, Bratislava; Attendance: 434

Game reference

Andrey Shutov
Goalies
Bence Bálizs
Referees:
(Denmark) Mads Frandsen
(Sweden) Christoffer Holm
Linesmen:
(Finland) Onni Hautamäki
(Sweden) Anders Nyqvist

Mikhailis (Shestakov) (PP) – 15:55	1–0
	1–1	22:38 – Szongoth (Terbócs, Ambrus)
Breus (Savitski) – 31:13	2–1
Mukhametov (Breus, Beketayev) – 34:06	3–1
	3–2	35:17 – Sofron (Nilsson, Erdély)
Mikhailis – 48:42	4–2
Mikhailis (Starchenko) – 53:34	5–2

4 min
Penalties
4 min
18
Shots
37

29 August 2024; 18:00	Slovakia	2–1 (0–0, 2–1, 0–0)	Austria	Ondrej Nepela Arena, Bratislava; Attendance: 8,670

Game reference

Samuel Hlavaj
Goalies
David Kickert
Referees:
(Canada) Michael Campbell
(Finland) Mikko Kaukokari
Linesmen:
(United States) Nick Briganti
(United States) Shane Gustafson

Gernát (M. Pospíšil, K. Pospíšil) – 32:16	1–0
Kelemen (Kňažko, Ivan) – 34:48	2–0
	2–1	39:52 – Heinrich (Reinbacher, Zwerger) (PP2)

8 min
Penalties
10 min
32
Shots
30

30 August 2024; 14:00	Kazakhstan	2–1 (1–0, 0–0, 1–1)	Austria	Ondrej Nepela Arena, Bratislava; Attendance: 397

Game reference

Andrey Shutov
Goalies
David Kickert
Referees:
(Canada) Michael Campbell
(Denmark) Mads Frandsen
Linesmen:
(United States) Shane Gustafson
(Sweden) Anders Nyqvist

Breus (Likhotnikov, Panyukov) – 01:45	1–0
	1–1	42:31 – Herburger (Rohrer, Ganahl)
Gaitamirov (Asetov) – 52:12	2–1

14 min
Penalties
6 min
22
Shots
46

30 August 2024; 18:00	Hungary	3–7 (1–1, 0–2, 2–4)	Slovakia	Ondrej Nepela Arena, Bratislava; Attendance: 8,824

Game reference

Ádám Vay
Goalies
Samuel Hlavaj
Referees:
(Sweden) Christoffer Holm
(Germany) André Schrader
Linesmen:
(Finland) Onni Hautamäki
(Czech Republic) Jiří Ondráček

Nilsson (Varga, Sebők) (PP) – 03:16	1–0
	1–1	04:15 – Hrivík (Nemec, Cingel) (PP)
	1–2	25:07 – Sukeľ (Liška, Sýkora)
	1–3	36:55 – Grman (Cingel, M. Pospíšil)
	1–4	45:11 – Regenda (K. Pospíšil, Ivan)
Bartalis – 45:39	2–4
	2–5	46:08 – Hudáček (Kelemen)
Bartalis (Erdély, B. Horváth) – 47:07	3–5
	3–6	54:28 – Tatar (Hrivík)
	3–7	54:45 – Lantoši (Gernát)

14 min
Penalties
14 min
12
Shots
40

1 September 2024; 14:00	Austria	4–3 GWS (0–3, 1–0, 2–0) (OT: 0–0) (SO: 1–0)	Hungary	Ondrej Nepela Arena, Bratislava; Attendance: 783

Game reference

Thomas Höneckl
Florian Vorauer
Goalies
Bence Bálizs
Referees:
(Canada) Michael Campbell
(Denmark) Mads Frandsen
Linesmen:
(United States) Nick Briganti
(Czech Republic) Jiří Ondráček

	0–1	04:15 – Galló (Hadobás, Sebők)
	0–2	11:34 – Papp (Varga)
	0–3	18:16 – Szabó (Sebők, Ambrus)
Haudum (Unterweger, Zwerger) (PP) – 38:33	1–3
Zwerger (Maier) – 51:38	2–3
Zwerger (Haudum, Reinbacher) (EA) – 59:16	3–3

Ganahl (miss)
Kasper (miss)
Heinrich (miss)
Zwerger
Baumgartner (miss)
Haudum
Shootout
(miss) Papp
(miss) Bartalis
(miss) Varga
(miss) Erdély
B. Horváth
(miss) B. Horváth
14 min
Penalties
10 min
40
Shots
26

1 September 2024; 18:00	Slovakia	3–1 (2–0, 1–1, 0–0)	Kazakhstan	Ondrej Nepela Arena, Bratislava; Attendance: 9,128

Game reference

Samuel Hlavaj
Goalies
Andrey Shutov
Referees:
(Finland) Mikko Kaukokari
(Germany) André Schrader
Linesmen:
(United States) Shane Gustafson
(Finland) Onni Hautamäki

Lantoši (Hrivík, Čerešňák) (PP) – 04:54	1–0
Regenda (Kňažko, M. Pospíšil) – 12:21	2–0
Liška (Sýkora) – 30:16	3–0
	3–1	35:52 – Mikhailis (Metalnikov)

14 min
Penalties
8 min
34
Shots
28

=== Group E ===
Group E

Tournament details
- Host country: Latvia
- City: Riga
- Venue: 1 (in 1 host city)
- Dates: 29 August – 1 September 2024
- Teams: 4

Tournament statistics
- Games played: 6
- Goals scored: 42 (7 per game)
- Attendance: 30,630 (5,105 per game)
- Scoring leader: (France) Alexandre Texier (6 points)

Official website
- IIHF

The tournament was held in Riga, Latvia.

Pos	Team	Pld	W	OTW	OTL	L	GF	GA	GD	Pts	Qualification
1	Latvia (H)	3	3	0	0	0	14	5	+9	9	2026 Winter Olympics
2	France	3	2	0	0	1	14	8	+6	6	2026 Winter Olympics
3	Slovenia	3	1	0	0	2	9	11	−2	3	
4	Ukraine	3	0	0	0	3	5	18	−13	0	

Source: IIHF
Rules for classification: 1) points; 2) head-to-head points; 3) head-to-head goal difference; 4) head-to-head number of goals scored; 5) result against closest best-ranked team outside tied teams; 6) result against second-best ranked team outside tied teams; 7) seeding before tournament.
(H) Host

All times are local (UTC+3).

29 August 2024; 16:00	France	7–2 (2–0, 3–0, 2–2)	Ukraine	Arena Riga, Riga; Attendance: 370

Game reference

Quentin Papillon
Goalies
Bogdan Dyachenko
Eduard Zakharchenko
Referees:
(Sweden) Tobias Björk
(Switzerland) Michael Tscherrig
Linesmen:
(Denmark) Albert Ankerstjerne
(Czech Republic) Lukáš Rampir

Chakiachvili (Llorca) – 08:57	1–0
Da Costa (Auvitu, Texier) (PP) – 15:36	2–0
Bellemare (Auvitu, Dubé) – 24:11	3–0
Treille (Chakiachvili, Dubé) (PP) – 28:22	4–0
Dubé (Cantagallo, Bozon) – 29:50	5–0
	5–1	43:08 – Lialka (Pangelov-Yuldashev, Denyskin)
Perret (Boudon) – 44:41	6–1
Bertrand (Texier, Da Costa) – 49:41	7–1
	7–2	58:42 – Peresunko (SH)

10 min
Penalties
10 min
34
Shots
27

29 August 2024; 20:00	Latvia	4–2 (2–1, 2–1, 0–0)	Slovenia	Arena Riga, Riga; Attendance: 9,200

Game reference

Kristers Gudļevskis
Goalies
Gašper Krošelj
Referees:
(Finland) Riku Brander
(Canada) Mike Langin
Linesmen:
(Finland) Tommi Niittylä
(Switzerland) Dominik Schlegel

Balinskis (Daugaviņš, Ābols) (PP) – 01:21	1–0
	1–1	02:07 – Tičar
Balcers (Ābols, Daugaviņš) (PP) – 18:55	2–1
Dzierkals (Batņa, Ro. Bukarts) – 25:11	3–1
	3–2	34:42 – Maver (Tomaževič)
Ābols (Daugaviņš, Egle) (PP) – 38:33	4–2

8 min
Penalties
18 min
54
Shots
22

30 August 2024; 16:00	France	5–1 (2–0, 0–1, 3–0)	Slovenia	Arena Riga, Riga; Attendance: 410

Game reference

Quentin Papillon
Goalies
Matija Pintarič
Referees:
(Canada) Mike Langin
(United States) Sean MacFarlane
Linesmen:
(Denmark) Albert Ankerstjerne
(Finland) Tommi Niittylä

Texier (Bertrand) – 06:18	1–0
Texier (Da Costa, Crinon) – 11:12	2–0
	2–1	35:25 – Urbas (Jeglič, Gregorc)
Texier (Auvitu, Da Costa) (PP) – 45:43	3–1
Bozon (Dubé) – 46:15	4–1
Bozon (Dubé) – 49:50	5–1

8 min
Penalties
4 min
22
Shots
19

30 August 2024; 20:00	Ukraine	1–5 (0–2, 0–3, 1–0)	Latvia	Arena Riga, Riga; Attendance: 9,800

Game reference

Eduard Zakharchenko
Goalies
Kristers Gudļevskis
Referees:
(Finland) Riku Brander
(Switzerland) Michael Tscherrig
Linesmen:
(Slovakia) Oto Durmis
(Czech Republic) Lukáš Rampir

	0–1	15:03 – Ločmelis (Indrašis, Freibergs)
	0–2	16:10 – Ro. Bukarts (Dzierkals, Balinskis)
	0–3	29:22 – Egle (Daugaviņš, Balinskis) (PP)
	0–4	32:50 – Ri. Bukarts (Balinskis) (PP)
	0–5	34:28 – Indrašis (Ri. Bukarts, Jaks)
Trakht (Zakharov) – 48:27	1–5

10 min
Penalties
4 min
17
Shots
38

1 September 2024; 13:00	Slovenia	6–2 (2–0, 1–2, 3–0)	Ukraine	Arena Riga, Riga; Attendance: 550

Game reference

Žan Us
Goalies
Bogdan Dyachenko
Oleg Petrov
Referees:
(Finland) Riku Brander
(Switzerland) Michael Tscherrig
Linesmen:
(Finland) Tommi Niittylä
(Switzerland) Dominik Schlegel

Urbas (Jeglič, Gregorc) (PP) – 05:19	1–0
Drozg (Macuh) – 12:20	2–0
Drozg (Gregorc) – 28:19	3–0
	3–1	35:47 – Lyalka (Zakharov, Fadyeyev) (PP2)
	3–2	36:45 – Pagelov-Yuldashev (Lyalka, Fadyeyev) (PP2)
Urbas (Pavlin) – 40:12	4–2
Jeglič (Magovac, Drozg) – 50:33	5–2
Kuralt (Jeglič) – 52:03	6–2

14 min
Penalties
35 min
36
Shots
18

1 September 2024; 17:00	Latvia	5–2 (2–1, 3–0, 0–1)	France	Arena Riga, Riga; Attendance: 10,300

Game reference

Kristers Gudļevskis
Goalies
Quentin Papillon
Referees:
(Sweden) Tobias Björk
(United States) Sean MacFarlane
Linesmen:
(Denmark) Albert Ankerstjerne
(Slovakia) Oto Durmis

	0–1	00:21 – Bertrand (Texier)
Tralmaks (Rubīns) – 05:08	1–1
Ro. Bukarts (Jaks, Ločmelis) (PP) – 07:52	2–1
Ābols (Rubīns) – 23:48	3–1
Dzierkals (Jaks) – 25:18	4–1
Rubīns (Mamčics) – 39:32	5–1
	5–2	56:53 – Da Costa

4 min
Penalties
8 min
36
Shots
19

=== Group F ===
Group F

Tournament details
- Host country: Denmark
- City: Aalborg
- Venue: 1 (in 1 host city)
- Dates: 29 August – 1 September 2024
- Teams: 4

Tournament statistics
- Games played: 6
- Goals scored: 31 (5.17 per game)
- Attendance: 11,937 (1,990 per game)
- Scoring leader(s): (Norway) Patrick Thoresen (Norway) Mats Zuccarello (5 points)

Official website
- IIHF

The tournament was held in Aalborg, Denmark.

Pos	Team	Pld	W	OTW	OTL	L	GF	GA	GD	Pts	Qualification
1	Denmark (H)	3	2	1	0	0	10	4	+6	8	2026 Winter Olympics
2	Norway	3	2	0	0	1	11	8	+3	6	
3	Great Britain	3	1	0	0	2	6	11	−5	3	
4	Japan	3	0	0	1	2	6	10	−4	1	

Source: IIHF
Rules for classification: 1) points; 2) head-to-head points; 3) head-to-head goal difference; 4) head-to-head number of goals scored; 5) result against closest best-ranked team outside tied teams; 6) result against second-best ranked team outside tied teams; 7) seeding before tournament.
(H) Host

All times are local (UTC+2).

29 August 2024; 15:30	Norway	4–2 (0–1, 3–0, 1–1)	Japan	Gigantium, Aalborg; Attendance: 1,208

Game reference

Henrik Haukeland
Goalies
Yuta Narisawa
Referees:
(Latvia) Andris Ansons
(Sweden) Mikael Holm
Linesmen:
(Germany) Patrick Laguzov
(Sweden) Ludvig Lundgren

	0–1	16:06 – T. Nakajima (Hanzawa)
Olimb (Olsen, Engebråten) – 34:15	1–1
Thoresen (Zuccarello, Salsten) – 38:24	2–1
Brandsegg-Nygård (Zuccarello, Solberg) (PP) – 39:33	3–1
Brandsegg-Nygård – 42:54	4–1
	4–2	54:11 – Hirano (Sato, S. Nakajima) (PP)

6 min
Penalties
8 min
35
Shots
32

29 August 2024; 19:30	Denmark	3–1 (1–1, 0–0, 2–0)	Great Britain	Gigantium, Aalborg; Attendance: 2,102

Game reference

Frederik Andersen
Goalies
Ben Bowns
Referees:
(Slovakia) Peter Stano
(Finland) Kristian Vikman
Linesmen:
(United States) Jake Davis
(Czech Republic) Josef Špůr

Lauridsen (Blichfeld, Eller) – 03:15	1–0
	1–1	08:21 – Kirk (Neilson, Mosey) (PP)
Ehlers (Blichfeld, Lauridsen) (PP) – 45:34	2–1
Eller (Blichfeld, Jensen) – 51:32	3–1

8 min
Penalties
2 min
34
Shots
15

30 August 2024; 15:30	Norway	6–2 (2–0, 3–0, 1–2)	Great Britain	Gigantium, Aalborg; Attendance: 891

Game reference

Jonas Arntzen
Goalies
Ben Bowns
Referees:
(Latvia) Andris Ansons
(Sweden) Mikael Holm
Linesmen:
(United States) Jake Davis
(Czech Republic) Josef Špůr

Thoresen (Krogdahl, Kåsastul) – 07:21	1–0
Thoresen (Zuccarello, Solberg) (PP) – 09:26	2–0
Thoresen (Nørstebø, Zuccarello) – 20:35	3–0
Johannesen (Olimb, Pettersen) – 30:38	4–0
Pettersen (Olimb, Olsen) – 36:27	5–0
	5–1	45:19 – Waller (Kirk) (PP)
	5–2	52:13 – Davies (Ruopp, Neilson)
Olimb (Pettersen, Norstebo) – 52:33	6–2

8 min
Penalties
6 min
35
Shots
23

30 August 2024; 19:30	Japan	2–3 OT (1–2, 1–0, 0–0) (OT: 0–1)	Denmark	Gigantium, Aalborg; Attendance: 3,279

Game reference

Yuta Narisawa
Goalies
Frederik Andersen
Referees:
(Czech Republic) Jan Hribik
(Slovakia) Peter Stano
Linesmen:
(Germany) Patrick Laguzov
(Latvia) Dāvis Zunde

Nakajima (Hanzawa) – 10:24	1–0
	1–1	11:01 – Røndbjerg (True, Koch)
	1–2	17:31 – Wesje (Poulsen, Koch)
Furuhashi (Miura, Sato) – 36:08	2–2
	2–3	63:45 – Eller (Ehlers, Lauridsen)

10 min
Penalties
4 min
18
Shots
39

1 September 2024; 12:30	Great Britain	3–2 (3–0, 0–2, 0–0)	Japan	Gigantium, Aalborg; Attendance: 1,017

Game reference

Jackson Whistle
Goalies
Yuta Narisawa
Referees:
(Latvia) Andris Ansons
(Finland) Kristian Vikman
Linesmen:
(United States) Jake Davis
(Czech Republic) Josef Špůr

Norris (Halbert, Waller) (PP) – 02:59	1–0
Kirk (Halbert, Neilson) (PP) – 14:18	2–0
Waller (Lake, Halbert) – 16:20	3–0
	3–1	22:51 – K. Otsu (Y. Otsu)
	3–2	36:55 – Furuhashi (Sato, Osawa)

6 min
Penalties
4 min
33
Shots
31

1 September 2024; 16:30	Denmark	4–1 (0–1, 2–0, 2–0)	Norway	Gigantium, Aalborg; Attendance: 3,440

Game reference

Frederik Andersen
Goalies
Henrik Haukeland
Referees:
(Sweden) Mikael Holm
(Czech Republic) Jan Hribik
Linesmen:
(Sweden) Ludvig Lundgren
(Latvia) Dāvis Zunde

	0–1	00:26 – Zuccarello (Salsten, Thoresen)
Jensen (Eller, Lauridsen) – 36:04	1–1
Jensen (Ehlers) (PP) – 38:03	2–1
Russell (Ehlers, Lassen) – 56:31	3–1
Russell (Jensen) (EN) – 58:33	4–1

10 min
Penalties
10 min
20
Shots
31
