= Martin Pospíšil =

Martin Pospíšil may refer to:

- Martin Pospíšil (footballer) (born 1991), Czech footballer
- Martin Pospíšil (ice hockey) (born 1999), Slovak ice hockey player
