= Alikhan Asetov =

Kazakhstani ice hockey player (born 1996)

- Born: 26 August 1996 (age 30) Oskemen, Kazakhstan
- Height: 1.88 m (6 ft 2 in)
- Weight: 87 kg (192 lb; 13 st 10 lb)
- Position: Right wing
- Shoots: Left
- KHL team: Barys Astana
- National team: Kazakhstan
- Playing career: 2015–present

Alikhan Asetov (born 26 August 1996) is a Kazakhstani professional ice hockey forward who plays for Barys Astana of the Kontinental Hockey League (KHL) and the Kazakhstan national team.

== Playing career ==
Asetov began his professional career with Nomad Astana in the 2016–17 season, recording 14 goals and 23 assists for 37 points in 51 regular-season games. He remained with Nomad for the 2017–18 season, recording 13 goals and 22 assists in 42 games.

Asetov made his KHL debut with Barys Astana during the 2015–16 season, appearing in one game. He established himself in the Barys lineup in subsequent seasons, recording five goals and two assists in 46 games during the 2018–19 season.

During the 2019–20 season, Asetov recorded four goals and four points in 29 KHL games with Barys Nur-Sultan, while also playing 19 games for Nomad Astana in the VHL, recording seven goals and nine assists.

Asetov recorded nine points in 37 KHL games during the 2020–21 season, followed by nine points in 35 games during the 2021–22 season.

In 2022–23, Asetov played 58 KHL games for Barys Astana, recording three goals and one assist. He followed that with three points in 41 games during the 2023–24 season, and 13 points in 47 games during the 2024–25 season.

In the 2025–26 season, Asetov recorded six goals and seven assists for 13 points in 50 KHL regular-season games.

== International play ==
Asetov represented Kazakhstan at the IIHF World Junior Championship and later became a member of the senior Kazakhstan national team. He represented Kazakhstan at the 2021 IIHF World Championship.

== Career statistics ==
=== Regular season and playoffs ===
| | | | Regular season | | | | | Playoffs |
| Season | Team | League | GP | G | A | Pts | PIM | GP | G | A | Pts | PIM |
|---|---|---|---|---|---|---|---|---|---|---|---|---|
| 2012–13 | Torpedo Ust-Kamenogorsk-2 | KAZ | 1 | 0 | 0 | 0 | 0 | — | — | — | — | — |
| 2013–14 | Snezhnye Barsy | MHL | 37 | 4 | 0 | 4 | 29 | — | — | — | — | — |
| 2014–15 | Snezhnye Barsy | MHL | 42 | 10 | 11 | 21 | 24 | 5 | 0 | 0 | 0 | 4 |
| 2014–15 | Nomad Astana | KAZ | 4 | 3 | 2 | 5 | 2 | — | — | — | — | — |
| 2015–16 | Barys Astana | KHL | 1 | 0 | 0 | 0 | 0 | — | — | — | — | — |
| 2015–16 | Nomad Astana | KAZ | 2 | 0 | 0 | 0 | 0 | — | — | — | — | — |
| 2015–16 | Snezhnye Barsy | MHL | 39 | 15 | 17 | 32 | 49 | 8 | 4 | 1 | 5 | 0 |
| 2016–17 | Nomad Astana | KAZ | 51 | 14 | 23 | 37 | 39 | 15 | 5 | 6 | 11 | 2 |
| 2017–18 | Nomad Astana | KAZ | 42 | 13 | 22 | 35 | 24 | 7 | 0 | 3 | 3 | 0 |
| 2018–19 | Barys Astana | KHL | 46 | 5 | 2 | 7 | 8 | 12 | 0 | 2 | 2 | 10 |
| 2018–19 | Nomad Astana | KAZ | 2 | 0 | 0 | 0 | 0 | 8 | 2 | 1 | 3 | 14 |
| 2019–20 | Barys Nur-Sultan | KHL | 29 | 4 | 0 | 4 | 4 | — | — | — | — | — |
| 2019–20 | Nomad Nur-Sultan | VHL | 19 | 7 | 9 | 16 | 24 | — | — | — | — | — |
| 2020–21 | Barys Nur-Sultan | KHL | 37 | 2 | 7 | 9 | 6 | 1 | 0 | 0 | 0 | 0 |
| 2020–21 | Nomad Nur-Sultan | VHL | 4 | 3 | 3 | 6 | 10 | 1 | 0 | 0 | 0 | 2 |
| 2021–22 | Barys Nur-Sultan | KHL | 35 | 4 | 5 | 9 | 10 | 2 | 0 | 0 | 0 | 0 |
| 2021–22 | Nomad Nur-Sultan | VHL | 8 | 2 | 4 | 6 | 6 | 4 | 0 | 0 | 0 | 0 |
| 2022–23 | Barys Astana | KHL | 58 | 3 | 1 | 4 | 19 | — | — | — | — | — |
| 2023–24 | Barys Astana | KHL | 41 | 0 | 3 | 3 | 36 | — | — | — | — | — |
| 2023–24 | Nomad Astana | VHL | 2 | 0 | 0 | 0 | 0 | 12 | 4 | 5 | 9 | 2 |
| 2024–25 | Barys Astana | KHL | 47 | 4 | 9 | 13 | 30 | — | — | — | — | — |
| 2024–25 | Nomad Astana | VHL | 1 | 0 | 1 | 1 | 0 | — | — | — | — | — |
| 2025–26 | Barys Astana | KHL | 50 | 6 | 7 | 13 | 25 | — | — | — | — | — |
| KHL totals | | | 344 | 28 | 34 | 62 | 138 | 15 | 0 | 2 | 2 | 10 |

=== International ===
| Year | Team | Event | GP | G | A | Pts | PIM |
|---|---|---|---|---|---|---|---|
| 2013 | Kazakhstan | U18 D1B | 5 | 0 | 1 | 1 | 2 |
| 2014 | Kazakhstan | U18 D1A | 5 | 0 | 1 | 1 | 2 |
| 2015 | Kazakhstan | WJC D1B | 5 | 1 | 2 | 3 | 2 |
| 2016 | Kazakhstan | WJC D1A | 5 | 6 | 0 | 6 | 0 |
| 2018 | Kazakhstan | WC D1A | 5 | 2 | 1 | 3 | 0 |
| 2019 | Kazakhstan | WC D1A | 5 | 0 | 1 | 1 | 0 |
| 2021 | Kazakhstan | WC | 6 | 0 | 2 | 2 | 0 |
| 2022 | Kazakhstan | WC | 7 | 1 | 2 | 3 | 4 |
| 2023 | Kazakhstan | WC | 1 | 0 | 0 | 0 | 0 |
| 2024 | Kazakhstan | WC | 7 | 1 | 1 | 2 | 4 |
| 2024 | Kazakhstan | OGQ | 3 | 0 | 1 | 1 | 0 |
| 2025 | Kazakhstan | WC | 5 | 0 | 1 | 1 | 0 |
| 2026 | Kazakhstan | WC D1A | 5 | 1 | 2 | 3 | 2 |
| Junior totals | | | 20 | 7 | 4 | 11 | 6 |
| Senior totals | | | 44 | 5 | 11 | 16 | 10 |
