= Adam Sýkora =

Slovak ice hockey player (born 2004)

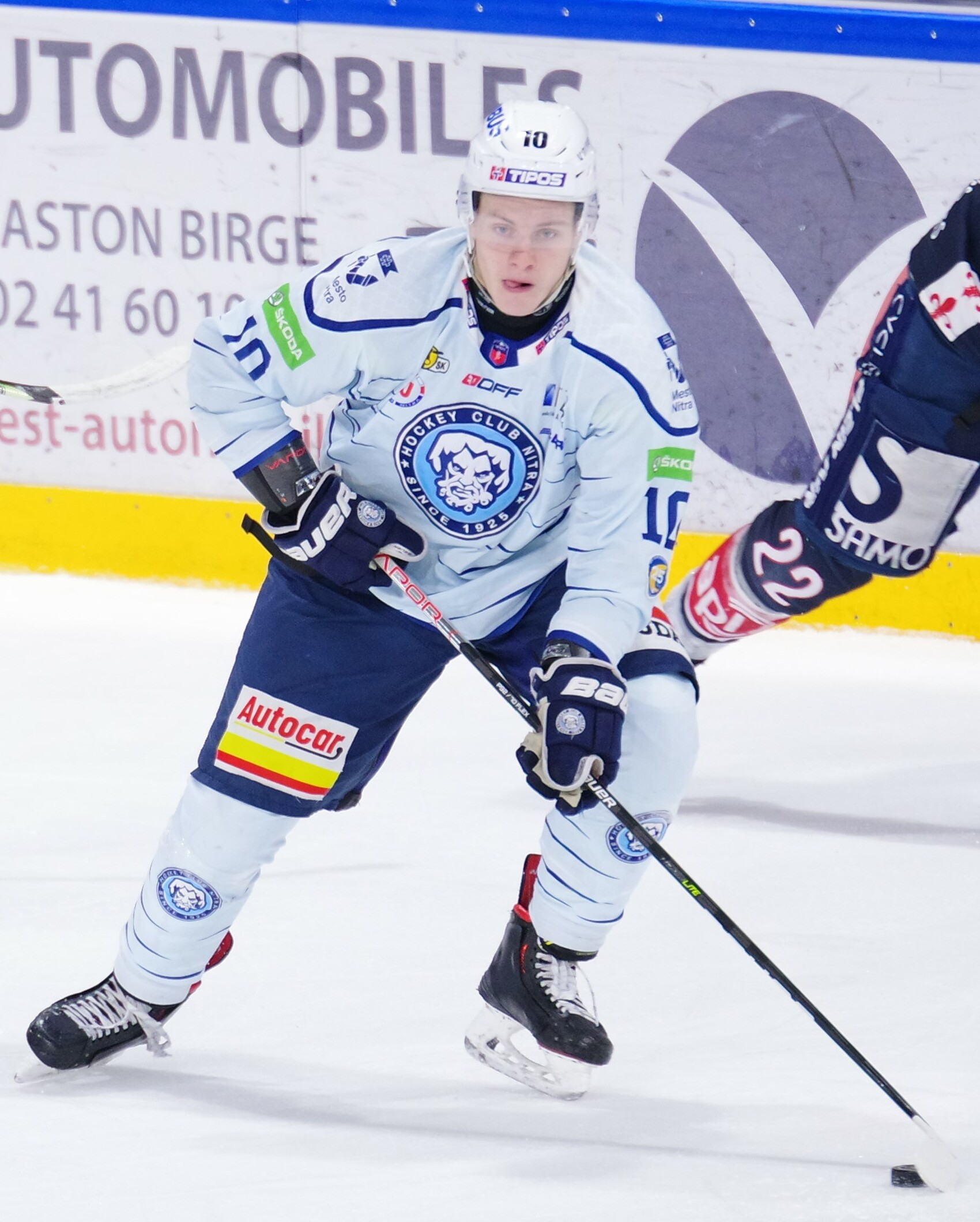
- Born: 7 September 2004 (age 21) Piešťany, Slovakia
- Height: 5 ft 10 in (178 cm)
- Weight: 179 lb (81 kg; 12 st 11 lb)
- Position: Forward
- Shoots: Left
- NHL team Former teams: New York Rangers; HK Nitra
- National team: Slovakia
- NHL draft: 63rd overall, 2022; New York Rangers
- Playing career: 2021–present

Adam Sýkora (born 7 September 2004) is a Slovak professional ice hockey player who is a forward for the New York Rangers of the National Hockey League (NHL). He was drafted by the Rangers in the second round, 63rd overall, of the 2022 NHL entry draft.

== Playing career ==
Sýkora was drafted by the New York Rangers with the 63rd overall pick of the 2022 NHL entry draft. He signed a three-year, entry-level contract with the Rangers on 15 July 2022. He joined the Rangers for the beginning of their 2022 training camp but was returned to HK Nitra of the Slovak Extraliga after playing one preseason game.

Sýkora scored 8 goals and had 13 assists in 38 games for HK Nitra in the 2022–23 season. He joined the Hartford Wolf Pack, New York's American Hockey League (AHL) affiliate, after HK Nitra was eliminated from the Extraliga playoffs in March 2023.

After Hartford was eliminated from the 2024 Calder Cup playoffs, he was recalled to the Rangers roster for the 2024 Stanley Cup playoffs.

During the 2025–26 season, Sýkora played mainly on Hartford's third line in a defensive and penalty killing role. After playing most of the 2025–26 season at Hartford, Sýkora was called up to the Rangers on 24 March 2026. He made his NHL debut for the Rangers against the Toronto Maple Leafs on 25 March. Sýkora scored his first NHL goal in the next game on 27 March, against the Chicago Blackhawks.

== International play ==
Medal record

Men's ice hockey

Representing Slovakia

Hlinka Gretzky Cup
Silver medal – second place	2021 Czech Republic/Slovakia	

Sýkora competed in 2020 Winter Youth Olympics in the boys' 3x3 mixed tournament.

He represented the Slovakia under-18 team on their runner-up team in the 2021 Hlinka Gretzky Cup, scoring two goals in five tournament games, including one in the semifinals game against Finland under-18 team. He also represented Slovakia in the World Junior Championships in 2022, 2023 and 2024. Sýkora was named the captain of the Slovakia team for the 2024 World Junior Championships.

Sýkora played for the Slovakia senior team in the 2022 World Championship, in which Slovakia finished in eighth place. He scored two goals and had one assist in six games during the tournament.

== Player profile ==
Sýkora's strengths as an ice hockey player are speed, defence and competitiveness, but his size likely hurt his NHL draft position. The Hockey News writer Steven Ellis wrote in advance of the 2022 World Championship that Sýkora "is an active forechecker who doesn't let his 5-foot-10 frame hold him back against the older and more physically mature competition in the Slovak men's league" and that "his playstyle and motor in combination with his skill and knack for finding a way to score give him the ability to play up and down the lineup." The Hockey News writer Tony Ferrari praised Sýkora's speed and creativity on offense and his backchecking ability and commitment on defence. Rangers' director of player development Jed Ortmeyer said of him after he participated in the Rangers' 2022 prospect camp "How can you not like him? He's got a smile on his face all the time. Just positive, he wants to work, he's excited to be here. Great energy in the room. It was fun to work with and get to know him this week." During the Rangers' 2023 development camp Ortmeyer described him as a "high energy guy." In 2024, after his rookie year at Hartford as a 19-year-old, Ortmeyer said:

He came into a new country, new cultures, and he got better as the year went on. He was captain of the World Junior team for his country. He’s just a kid that is happy to come to the rink every day with a smile on his face and infectious energy, and it spreads throughout the room. We’re really just excited to have him around and keep working with him.

HK Nitra general manager Tomáš Chrenko praised Sýkora's work ethic and said that:

When he was younger, I didn't think that he would be so good as a skater, but this is the result of his hard work. At the end of the shift, he still looks fresh because he's in such good physical condition...He plays like he has no fear. He goes everywhere. If he thinks it can help the team, he’ll take any role.

Chrenko noted that as a young player he was already the best defensive forward and a first pair penalty-killer for HK Nitra. However, some scouts feel that his offensive upside is limited and that he has no outside shot.

Sýkora said that he models his game after Brad Marchand. Sýkora said that "I really like Brad Marchand from the Boston Bruins. He's like a rat and he isn't scared of (taller) players."

Prior to the 2023–24 season, USA Today writer Vincent Z. Mercogliano rated Sýkora as the Rangers fourth best prospect. Prior to the 2024–25 season Mercogliano and McKeen's Hockey rated him as the Rangers' fifth best prospect and The Hockey News rated him as the Rangers' fourth best prospect. McKeen's felt that as a teenager playing in the AHL in 2023–24, Sýkora was not strong enough or quick enough to be an effective physical player yet, but that he still has potential to develop into a "terrific two-way forward."

During the off-season prior to the 2025–26 season, the Rangers asked him to work on improving his shooting skills. Before the 2025–26 season, Mercogliano and Peter Baugh of The Athletic rated Sýkora as the Rangers' 10th best prospect.

== Career statistics ==
=== Regular season and playoffs ===
			Regular season					Playoffs
Season	Team	League	GP	G	A	Pts	PIM	GP	G	A	Pts	PIM
2019–20	HK Nitra	Slovak-Jr.	9	3	5	8	0	—	—	—	—	—
2020–21	Team Slovakia U18	Slovak-Jr.	3	2	0	2	2	—	—	—	—	—
2020–21	Team Slovakia U18	Slovak.1	13	3	6	9	6	—	—	—	—	—
2020–21	HK Levice	Slovak.1	6	1	4	5	6	4	0	1	1	4
2020–21	HK Nitra	Slovak	15	0	2	2	2	—	—	—	—	—
2021–22	HK Nitra	Slovak-Jr.	1	0	0	0	0	—	—	—	—	—
2021–22	Team Slovakia U18	Slovak.1	3	0	0	0	2	—	—	—	—	—
2021–22	HK Nitra	Slovak	46	10	7	17	6	19	2	3	5	2
2022–23	HK Nitra	Slovak	38	8	13	21	8	8	1	3	4	4
2022–23	Hartford Wolf Pack	AHL	2	0	0	0	0	4	0	1	1	0
2023–24	Hartford Wolf Pack	AHL	66	8	15	23	4	10	0	3	3	0
2024–25	Hartford Wolf Pack	AHL	71	9	21	30	8	—	—	—	—	—
2025–26	Hartford Wolf Pack	AHL	62	12	17	29	28	—	—	—	—	—
2025–26	New York Rangers	NHL	11	3	1	4	5	—	—	—	—	—
Slovak totals			99	18	22	40	16	27	3	6	9	6
NHL totals			11	3	1	4	5	—	—	—	—	—

=== International ===
Year	Team	Event	Result	GP	G	A	Pts	PIM
2021	Slovakia	HG18	2nd place, silver medalist(s)	5	2	0	2	2
2022	Slovakia	U18-D1A	9th	1	1	1	2	0
2022	Slovakia	WC	8th	6	2	1	3	0
2022	Slovakia	WJC	9th	4	1	0	1	27
2023	Slovakia	WJC	6th	5	1	0	1	0
2024	Slovakia	WJC	6th	5	1	1	2	2
2024	Slovakia	OGQ	Q	3	0	2	2	2
2025	Slovakia	WC	11th	7	0	1	1	0
2026	Slovakia	WC	9th	7	0	1	1	2
Junior totals				20	6	2	8	31
Senior totals				23	2	5	7	4
