= Kristjan Kombe =

Estonian ice hockey player (born 2000)

- Born: 28 March 2000 (age 26) Kuressaare, Estonia
- Height: 1.87 m (6 ft 2 in)
- Weight: 86 kg (190 lb; 13 st 8 lb)
- Position: Centre
- Shoots: Left
- Liiga team Former teams: KalPa; HPK; Jokerit; JoKP
- National team: Estonia
- Playing career: 2018–present

Kristjan Kombe (born 28 March 2000) is an Estonian professional ice hockey centre who currently plays for KalPa in the Finnish Liiga.

Internationally, Kombe represents Estonia.

== Career statistics ==
=== Regular season and playoffs ===
			Regular season					Playoffs
Season	Team	League	GP	G	A	Pts	PIM	GP	G	A	Pts	PIM
2015–16	HPK	FIN U18	11	0	3	3	0	—	—	—	—	—
2016–17	HPK	FIN U18	46	12	22	34	22	2	0	0	0	0
2016–17	HPK	FIN U20	3	0	0	0	0	—	—	—	—	—
2017–18	HPK	FIN U18	5	2	9	11	14	3	0	1	1	0
2017–18	HPK	FIN U20	47	5	12	17	12	4	0	1	1	0
2018–19	HPK	FIN U20	48	10	26	36	10	6	1	5	6	2
2018–19	HPK	Liiga	3	0	0	0	2	—	—	—	—	—
2019–20	HPK	FIN U20	37	9	21	30	4	1	0	1	1	0
2019–20	HPK	Liiga	10	0	1	1	2	—	—	—	—	—
2020–21	HPK	Liiga	51	2	0	2	8	—	—	—	—	—
2021–22	Jokerit	KHL	3	1	0	1	2	—	—	—	—	—
2021–22	Kiekko-Vantaa	Mestis	44	8	22	30	18	3	0	0	0	4
2022–23	JoKP	Mestis	46	9	28	37	12	10	0	4	4	6
2023–24	JoKP	Mestis	48	16	35	51	42	7	0	5	5	6
2024–25	KalPa	Liiga	48	2	13	15	16	17	3	2	5	4
2025–26	KalPa	Liiga	31	1	4	5	0	8	0	0	0	0
Liiga totals			143	5	18	23	28	25	3	2	5	4
KHL totals			3	1	0	1	2	—	—	—	—	—

=== International statistics ===
Year	Team	Event	Result	GP	G	A	Pts	PIM
2020	Estonia	WJC-D1	21st	5	2	2	4	0
2022	Estonia	WC-D1	25th	4	0	3	3	4
2023	Estonia	WC-D1	26th	5	1	0	1	2
2024	Estonia	WC-D1	25th	5	1	6	7	0
2026	Estonia	WC-D1	23rd	4	2	6	8	0
Junior totals				5	2	2	4	0
Senior totals				18	4	15	19	6

== Awards and honours ==
Award	Year	Ref
Liiga
Kanada-malja champion	2025	
