= Arkadiy Shestakov (ice hockey) =

- Born: 24 March 1995 (age 31) Oskemen, Kazakhstan
- Height: 1.82 m (6 ft 0 in)
- Weight: 83 kg (183 lb; 13 st 1 lb)
- Position: Centre
- Shoots: Left
- KHL team Former teams: Barys Astana; Admiral Vladivostok
- National team: Kazakhstan
- NHL draft: Undrafted
- Playing career: 2013–present

Arkadiy Sergeyevich Shestakov (Russian: Арка́дий Серге́евич Шестако́в; born 24 March 1995) is a Kazakhstani ice hockey player for Barys Astana in the Kontinental Hockey League (KHL) and the Kazakhstani national team.

He represented Kazakhstan at the 2021 IIHF World Championship.
