= Martin Pospíšil (ice hockey) =

Slovak ice hockey player (born 1999)

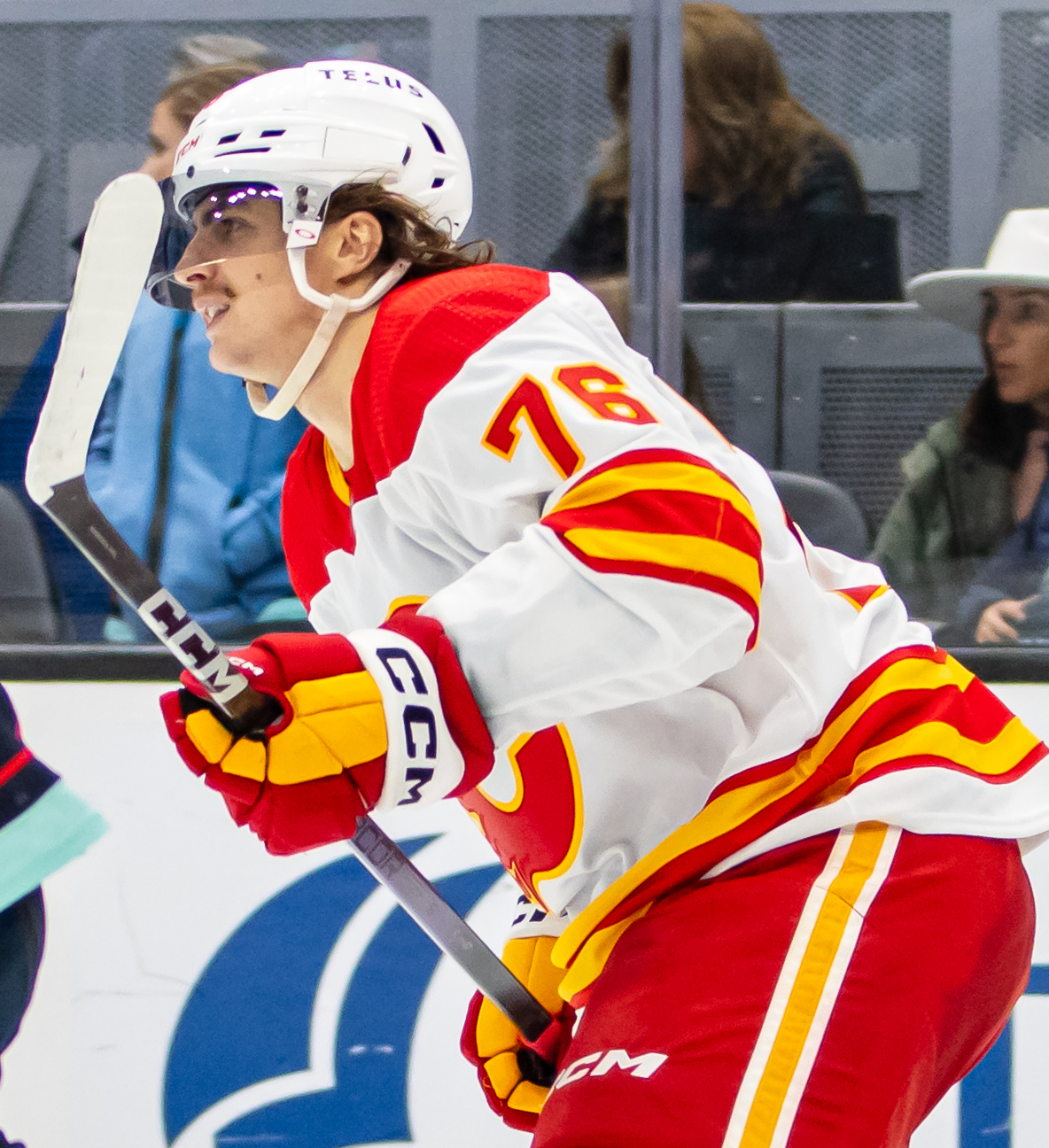
- Pospíšil with the Flames in 2023
- Born: 19 November 1999 (age 26) Zvolen, Slovakia
- Height: 6 ft 2 in (188 cm)
- Weight: 173 lb (78 kg; 12 st 5 lb)
- Position: Centre
- Shoots: Left
- NHL team Former teams: Calgary Flames; HC Košice
- National team: Slovakia
- NHL draft: 105th overall, 2018; Calgary Flames
- Playing career: 2019–present

Martin Pospíšil (born 19 November 1999) is a Slovak professional ice hockey player who is a centre for the Calgary Flames of the National Hockey League (NHL). His brother Kristián is also an ice-hockey player.

== Playing career ==
Prior to his professional career, Pospíšil played for the Sioux City Musketeers of the USHL. Amassing 37 points in 49 games, Pospíšil was drafted in the fourth round (105th overall pick) in the 2018 NHL entry draft by the Calgary Flames. He was signed to a three-year, entry-level contract by the Flames on 20 April 2019. On 13 August 2020, the Flames loaned Pospíšil to HC Košice of the Slovak Extraliga. He was later re-signed to one-year, two-way contracts in 2022 and 2023.

On 3 November 2023, Pospíšil was called up by the Flames and made his NHL debut the next day, scoring his first career NHL goal in a 6–3 win against the Seattle Kraken. On 18 January 2024, the Flames placed Pospíšil on injured reserve after he suffered an upper-body injury in a 4–3 loss to the Toronto Maple Leafs. On 6 March, Pospíšil was suspended three games for boarding Seattle Kraken's defenceman Vince Dunn.

== Career statistics ==
=== Regular season and playoffs ===
			Regular season					Playoffs
Season	Team	League	GP	G	A	Pts	PIM	GP	G	A	Pts	PIM
2017–18	Sioux City Musketeers	USHL	49	8	29	37	253	—	—	—	—	—
2018–19	Sioux City Musketeers	USHL	44	16	47	63	118	2	0	1	1	0
2019–20	Stockton Heat	AHL	26	3	7	10	56	—	—	—	—	—
2020–21	HC Košice	Slovak	22	9	8	17	102	—	—	—	—	—
2020–21	Stockton Heat	AHL	14	5	6	11	35	—	—	—	—	—
2021–22	Stockton Heat	AHL	47	7	18	25	95	11	2	4	6	6
2022–23	Calgary Wranglers	AHL	20	4	6	10	24	—	—	—	—	—
2023–24	Calgary Wranglers	AHL	6	3	3	6	6	—	—	—	—	—
2023–24	Calgary Flames	NHL	63	8	16	24	109	—	—	—	—	—
2024–25	Calgary Flames	NHL	81	4	21	25	84	—	—	—	—	—
2025–26	Calgary Flames	NHL	22	1	2	3	17	—	—	—	—	—
2025–26	Calgary Wranglers	AHL	2	0	0	0	2	—	—	—	—	—
NHL totals			166	13	39	52	210	—	—	—	—	—

=== International ===
Year	Team	Event	Result	GP	G	A	Pts	PIM
2017	Slovakia	U18	6th	4	0	0	0	0
2019	Slovakia	WJC	8th	5	0	2	2	8
2024	Slovakia	WC	7th	7	3	4	7	6
2024	Slovakia	OGQ	Q	3	0	3	3	4
2026	Slovakia	OG	4th	4	0	1	1	0
2026	Slovakia	WC	9th	7	1	3	4	4
Junior totals				9	0	2	2	8
Senior totals				21	4	11	15	14
