= Jordann Perret =

French ice hockey player (born 1994)

- Jordann Perret in 2026
- Born: 15 October 1994 (age 31) Autrans, France
- Height: 5 ft 10 in (178 cm)
- Weight: 174 lb (79 kg; 12 st 6 lb)
- Position: Forward
- Shoots: Left
- ELH team Former teams: Mountfield HK; HC Dynamo Pardubice; Brûleurs de Loups; Dragons de Rouen
- National team: France
- Playing career: 2012–present

Jordann Perret (born 15 October 1994) is a French professional ice hockey player who is a forward for Mountfield HK of the Czech Extraliga (ELH).

He participated in the 2017 IIHF World Championship.
