= Evgeny Skachkov =

Russian ice hockey player (born 1984)

- Born: 14 July 1984 (age 42) Moscow, Soviet Union
- Height: 6 ft 0 in (183 cm)
- Weight: 194 lb (88 kg; 13 st 12 lb)
- Position: Left wing
- Shoots: Left
- AIHL team Former teams: Newcastle Northstars; CSKA Moscow; Spartak Moscow; Traktor Chelyabinsk; Ak Bars Kazan; SKA Saint Petersburg; Torpedo Nizhny Novgorod; Salavat Yulaev Ufa; HC Sochi; HC Ugra; Yunost Minsk; HC Lada Togliatti; CSM Dunărea Galați; HSC Csíkszereda; CSM Corona Brașov; Red Hawks Bucuresti
- National team: Romania
- NHL draft: 221st overall, 2003; St. Louis Blues
- Playing career: 2003–present

Evgeny Viktorovich Skachkov (Russian: Евгений Викторович Скачков; born 14 July 1984) is a Russian-born Romanian professional ice hockey winger who currently plays for Newcastle Northstars of the Australian Ice Hockey League (AIHL).

== Playing career ==
He was selected by the St. Louis Blues in the 7th round (221st overall) of the 2003 NHL entry draft.

Skachkov made his Kontinental Hockey League debut playing with Traktor Chelyabinsk during the inaugural 2008–09 KHL season. He is currently playing for HSC Csíkszereda in the Erste Liga.

== Career statistics ==
=== Regular season and playoffs ===
			Regular season					Playoffs
Season	Team	League	GP	G	A	Pts	PIM	GP	G	A	Pts	PIM
2000–01	Dynamo–2 Moscow	RUS.3	18	1	1	2	4	—	—	—	—	—
2001–02	Dizelist Penza	RUS.2	9	0	0	0	0	—	—	—	—	—
2001–02	Dizelist–2 Penza	RUS.3	25	16	8	24	16	—	—	—	—	—
2002–03	Kapitan Stupino	EEHL	31	4	4	8	2	—	—	—	—	—
2002–03	Kapitan–2 Stupino	RUS.3	27	17	12	29	44	—	—	—	—	—
2003–04	CSKA Moscow	RSL	1	0	0	0	2	—	—	—	—	—
2003–04	CSKA–2 Moscow	RUS.3	59	30	15	45	62	—	—	—	—	—
2004–05	Spartak Moscow	RSL	9	0	2	2	0	—	—	—	—	—
2004–05	Spartak–2 Moscow	RUS.3	29	8	10	18	64	—	—	—	—	—
2005–06	Spartak Moscow	RSL	2	0	0	0	6	—	—	—	—	—
2005–06	Spartak–2 Moscow	RUS.3	60	26	32	58	116	—	—	—	—	—
2006–07	Traktor Chelyabinsk	RSL	52	13	9	22	52	—	—	—	—	—
2007–08	Traktor Chelyabinsk	RSL	53	14	13	27	58	3	1	0	1	6
2008–09	Traktor Chelyabinsk	KHL	54	14	18	32	56	—	—	—	—	—
2009–10	Traktor Chelyabinsk	KHL	51	22	14	36	143	3	0	0	0	14
2010–11	Ak Bars Kazan	KHL	21	7	5	12	14	—	—	—	—	—
2011–12	Ak Bars Kazan	KHL	36	5	6	11	22	11	2	0	2	12
2012–13	Ak Bars Kazan	KHL	28	1	3	4	18	—	—	—	—	—
2013–14	SKA St. Petersburg	KHL	37	7	4	11	22	—	—	—	—	—
2013–14	Torpedo Nizhny Novgorod	KHL	10	6	2	8	14	6	1	3	4	8
2014–15	Salavat Yulaev Ufa	KHL	56	6	17	23	22	5	0	0	0	25
2015–16	HC Sochi	KHL	51	14	16	30	14	4	0	0	0	0
2016–17	HC Sochi	KHL	31	4	4	8	16	—	—	—	—	—
2017–18	HC Yugra	KHL	28	1	6	7	24	—	—	—	—	—
2017–18	Yunost Minsk	BLR	9	3	5	8	10	15	4	6	10	6
2018–19	Lada Togliatti	VHL	20	6	5	11	28	—	—	—	—	—
2019–20	CSM Dunărea Galați	ROU	24	32	30	62	16	—	—	—	—	—
2020–21	CSM Dunărea Galați	ROU	23	30	16	14	31	7	6	8	14	2
2021–22	HSC Csíkszereda	EL	37	25	41	66	16	15	9	10	19	10
2021–22	HSC Csíkszereda	ROU	22	18	32	50	39	1	1	0	1	0
RSL totals			117	27	24	51	118	3	1	0	1	6
KHL totals			403	87	95	182	365	29	3	3	6	59

=== International ===
Year	Team	Event	GP	G	A	Pts	PIM
2022	Romania	WC D1A	4	2	3	5	6
Senior totals			4	2	3	5	6
