= Bohdan Dyachenko =

Ukrainian ice hockey player (born 1998)

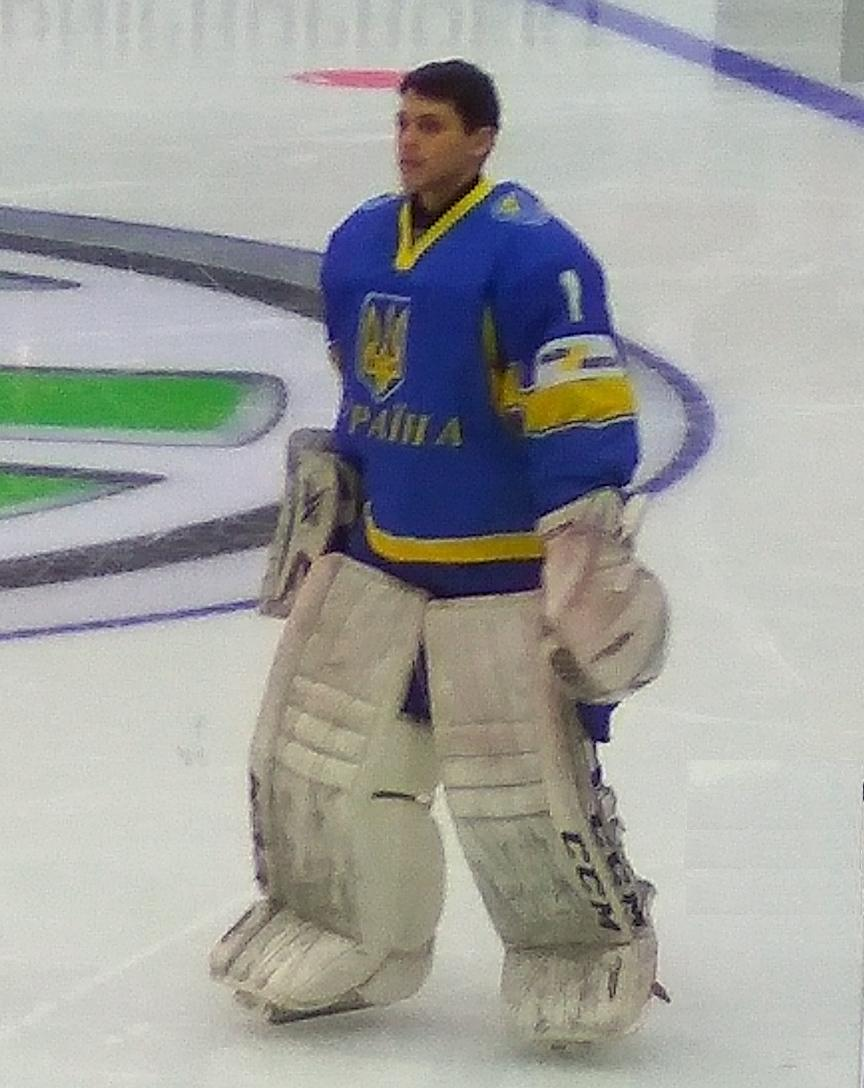
- Born: 6 October 1998 (age 27) Kharkiv, Ukraine
- Height: 1.82 m (6 ft 0 in)
- Weight: 85 kg (187 lb; 13 st 5 lb)
- Position: Goaltender
- Catches: Left
- PHL team: TMH Polonia Bytom
- National team: Ukraine
- Playing career: 2015–present

Bohdan Dyachenko (Ukrainian: Богдан Дяченко; born 6 October 1998) is a Ukrainian ice hockey player for TMH Polonia Bytom in the Polska Hokej Liga (PHL) and the Ukraine national team.

He represented Ukraine internationally since 2014.
