= Louis Boudon =

French ice hockey player (born 1998)

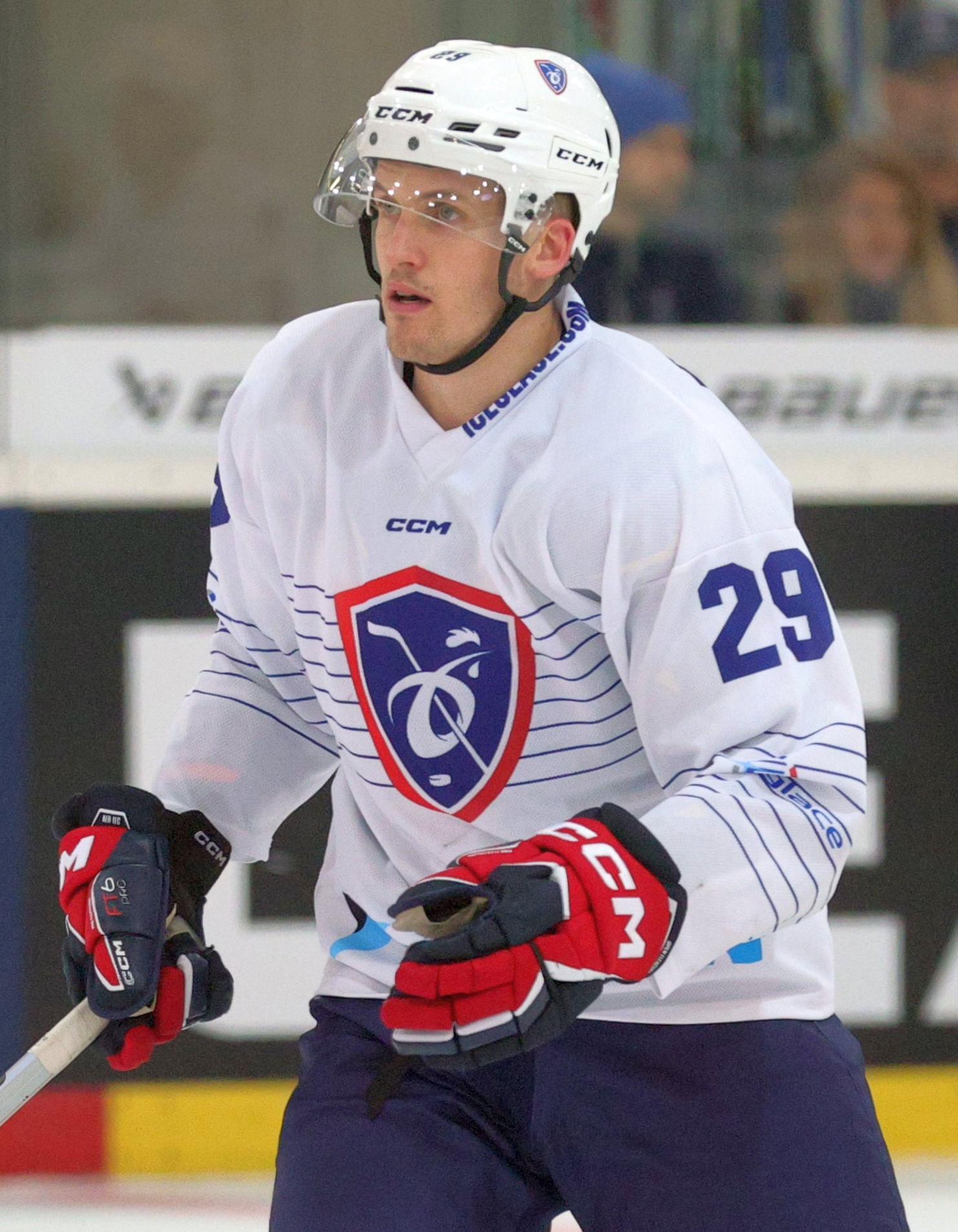
- Boudon with France in 2024
- Born: 4 October 1998 (age 27) Grenoble, France
- Height: 180 cm (5 ft 11 in)
- Weight: 82 kg (181 lb; 12 st 13 lb)
- Position: Centre
- Shoots: Left
- Liiga team Former teams: Mikkelin Jukurit; Ours de Villard-de-Lans; Metro Jets; Northeast Generals; Lake Superior State Lakers; Laval Rocket; Iowa Wild; Iowa Heartlanders; Nybro Vikings; Atlanta Gladiators
- National team: France
- NHL draft: Undrafted
- Playing career: 2023–present

Louis Boudon (born 4 October 1998) is a French professional ice hockey player who is a centre for Mikkelin Jukurit of the Liiga.

Boudon was selected to play for the French national team at the 2026 Winter Olympics.

== Playing career ==
Boudon made his return to the United States in 2025, signing a contract with the Atlanta Gladiators of the ECHL for the 2025–26 season. In 25 games with the team, he had 30 points, consisting of 12 goals and 18 assists.

During the 2025–26 season, Boudon changed continents and signed a contract with Mikkelin Jukurit of the Liiga, the top professional hockey league in Finland.
