= Ihor Merezhko =

Ukrainian ice hockey player (born 1998)

- Born: 30 April 1998 (age 28) Kharkiv, Ukraine
- Height: 1.94 m (6 ft 4 in)
- Weight: 100 kg (220 lb; 15 st 10 lb)
- Position: Defence
- Shoots: Right
- ELH team Former teams: HC Škoda Plzeň; Humo Tashkent; Rubin Tyumen; Odense Bulldogs; HK Spišská Nová Ves
- National team: Ukraine
- Playing career: 2019–present

Ihor Merezhko (Ukrainian: Ігор Мережко; born 30 April 1998) is a Ukrainian professional ice hockey defenceman who currently plays for HC Škoda Plzeň of the Czech Extraliga.

Merezhko also represents Ukraine in international hockey competitions.

In 2023, he was recognized as the best Ukrainian hockey player.

== Career ==
Merezhko began his hockey career at the Kharkiv SDYUSHOR (Sports School of Olympic Reserve). He is a graduate of the "Donbass 98" program. The 2014–2015 season saw him playing for Red Bull Salzburg in Austria. In 2015, he moved to Canada, where he spent four seasons in the Western Hockey League (WHL). In 2019, Merezhko signed his first professional contract with Humo Tashkent, a team competing in the Supreme Hockey League (VHL). He then played the 2020–2021 and 2021–2022 seasons with Rubin Tyumen, another VHL club. In the 2020–2021 season, he became a bronze medalist in the VHL. The 2021–2022 season was a championship-winning season for Merezhko.

Since 2022, he has been the captain of the Ukrainian national ice hockey team.

In 2022, Merezhko signed a one-year contract with the Odense Bulldogs, a team in the Danish Hockey League.

In 2023, he was recognized as the best Ukrainian hockey player.

The 2023–2024 season saw Merezhko playing in the Slovak Extraliga for HK Spišská Nová Ves. His team finished as the league's runner-up.

Following his season in Slovakia, Merezhko joined the Czech Extraliga team HC Plzeň "Škoda".

== Achievements ==
- VHL Bronze Medalist 2020–2021
- VHL Champion 2021–2022
- Slovak Extraliga Silver Medalist 2023–24

== World Championship Division I Group B ==
Medals	Tournament	Location
🥉 Bronze medal – third place	World Championship Division I Group B	Tychy (Poland) 2022
🥈 Silver medal – second place	World Championship Division I Group B	Tallinn (Estonia) 2023
🥇 Gold medal – first place	World Championship Division I Group B	Vilnius (Lithuania) 2024

== Career statistics ==
=== Regular season and playoffs ===
			Regular season					Playoffs
Season	Team	League	GP	G	A	Pts	PIM	GP	G	A	Pts	PIM
2015–16	Lethbridge Hurricanes	WHL	56	0	10	10	61	5	0	0	0	4
2016–17	Lethbridge Hurricanes	WHL	72	2	19	21	88	20	0	10	10	12
2017–18	Lethbridge Hurricanes	WHL	71	5	28	33	76	16	0	4	4	13
2018–19	Lethbridge Hurricanes	WHL	55	4	31	35	42	7	0	2	2	4
2019–20	Humo Tashkent	VHL	43	1	8	9	35	11	0	5	5	11
2020–21	Rubin Tyumen	VHL	44	3	13	16	25	16	1	6	7	8
2021–22	Rubin Tyumen	VHL	50	10	15	25	14	7	0	6	6	4
2022–23	Odense Bulldogs	Metal Ligaen	48	13	23	36	41	6	2	6	8	2
2023–24	HK Spišská Nová Ves	Slovak Extraliga	49	10	38	48	14	5	1	8	9	4
VHL totals			137	14	36	50	74	34	1	17	18	23
