= Matias Haaranen =

Finnish-Romanian ice hockey player

- Born: 11 July 1996 (age 29) Riihimäki, Finland
- Height: 5 ft 7 in (170 cm)
- Weight: 159 lb (72 kg; 11 st 5 lb)
- Position: Defence
- Shoots: Left
- Erste Liga team Former teams: Gyergyói HK; HPK
- National team: Romania
- NHL draft: Undrafted
- Playing career: 2015–present

Matias Haaranen (born 11 July 1996) is a Finnish/Romanian ice hockey defenceman. He is currently playing with the HK Gyergyoi in the Hungarian Erste Liga (ice hockey) and Romanian Campionatul National leagues.

Haaranen made his Liiga debut playing with HPK during the 2014–15 Liiga season.
