= Speed skating at the 2025 Asian Winter Games =

Speed skating competitions at the 2025 Asian Winter Games

- Venue: Heilongjiang Speed Skating Hall
- Dates: 8–11 February 2025
- Competitors: 90 from 10 nations

Speed skating competitions at the 2025 Asian Winter Games in Harbin, China, were held at Heilongjiang Winter Sports Training Center Speed Skating Rink between 8–11 February 2025.

Chinese Taipei won its first ever Asian Winter Games medal, when Chen Ying-chu won silver in the women's 100 metres event.

== Schedule ==
F	Final

Event↓/Date →	8th Sat	9th Sun	10th Mon	11th Tue
Men's 100 m	F			
Men's 500 m			F	
Men's 1000 m				F
Men's 1500 m	F			
Men's 5000 m		F		
Men's team sprint			F	
Men's team pursuit				F
Women's 100 m	F			
Women's 500 m		F		
Women's 1000 m				F
Women's 1500 m	F			
Women's 3000 m			F	
Women's team sprint		F		
Women's team pursuit				F

== Medalists ==
=== Men ===
Event	Gold	Silver	Bronze
100 m	Gao Tingyu; China	Yevgeniy Koshkin; Kazakhstan	Kim Jun-ho; South Korea
500 m	Gao Tingyu; China	Wataru Morishige; Japan	Kim Jun-ho; South Korea
1000 m	Ning Zhongyan; China	Cha Min-kyu; South Korea	Lian Ziwen; China
1500 m	Ning Zhongyan; China	Kazuya Yamada; Japan	Ryota Kojima; Japan
5000 m	Wu Yu; China	Liu Hanbin; China	Hanahati Muhamaiti; China
Team sprint	China; Gao Tingyu; Lian Ziwen; Ning Zhongyan	South Korea; Kim Jun-ho; Cha Min-kyu; Cho Sang-hyeok	Japan; Katsuhiro Kuratsubo; Wataru Morishige; Kazuya Yamada
Team pursuit	China; Liu Hanbin; Wu Yu; Hanahati Muhamaiti	South Korea; Chung Jae-won; Park Sang-eon; Lee Seung-hoon	Japan; Motonaga Arito; Taiyo Morino; Kotaro Kasahara

=== Women ===
Event	Gold	Silver	Bronze
100 m	Lee Na-hyun; South Korea	Kim Min-sun; South Korea	Chen Ying-chu; Chinese Taipei
500 m	Kim Min-sun; South Korea	Lee Na-hyun; South Korea	Tian Ruining; China
1000 m	Han Mei; China	Yin Qi; China	Lee Na-hyun; South Korea
1500 m	Han Mei; China	Yang Binyu; China	Yin Qi; China
3000 m	Yang Binyu; China	Han Mei; China	Tai Zhien; China
Team sprint	South Korea; Kim Min-ji; Lee Na-hyun; Kim Min-sun	China; Yu Shihui; Tian Ruining; Han Mei	Kazakhstan; Kristina Silaeva; Darya Vazhenina; Nadezhda Morozova
Team pursuit	China; Yang Binyu; Ahenaer Adake; Han Mei	Japan; Yuka Takahashi; Yuna Onodera; Rin Kosaka	South Korea; Park Ji-woo; Jeong Yu-na; Kim Yoon-ji

== Medal table ==
Rank	Nation	Gold	Silver	Bronze	Total
1	China (CHN)	11	5	5	21
2	South Korea (KOR)	3	5	4	12
3	Japan (JPN)	0	3	3	6
4	Kazakhstan (KAZ)	0	1	1	2
5	Chinese Taipei (TPE)	0	0	1	1
Totals (5 entries)		14	14	14	42

== Participating nations ==
A total of 90 athletes from 10 nations competed in speed skating at the 2025 Asian Winter Games:

- China (19)
- Chinese Taipei (2)
- Hong Kong (2)
- India (9)
- Japan (17)
- Kazakhstan (18)
- Mongolia (1)
- South Korea (20)
- Thailand (1)
- Uzbekistan (1)
