= South Korea at the 2025 Asian Winter Games =

- Flag of South Korea
- IOC code: KOR
- NOC: Korean Olympic Committee

in Harbin, China 7 February 2025 – 14 February 2025
- Competitors: 149 in 11 sports
- Flag bearers: Chong-Min Lee & Gim Eun-ji
- Medals Ranked 2nd: Gold 16 Silver 15 Bronze 14 Total 45

Asian Winter Games appearances (overview)
- 1986; 1990; 1996; 1999; 2003; 2007; 2011; 2017; 2025; 2029

South Korea competed in the 2025 Asian Winter Games in Harbin, China, from February 7 to 14.

The South Korean team consisted of 149 athletes. During the opening ceremony, hockey player Chong-Min Lee and curler Gim Eun-ji were the country's flagbearers.

== Medalists ==
| Medal | Name | Sport | Event | Date |
|---|---|---|---|---|
| Gold | Lee Seung-hun | Freestyle skiing | Men's halfpipe | 8 February |
| Gold | Park Ji-won | Short-track speed skating | Men's 1500 metres | 8 February |
| Gold | Choi Min-jeong | Short-track speed skating | Women's 500 metres | 8 February |
| Gold | Kim Gil-li | Short-track speed skating | Women's 1500 metres | 8 February |
| Gold | Kim Gil-li; Choi Min-jeong; Park Ji-won; Kim Tae-sung; Jang Sung-woo^{a} Noh Do-hee^{a} Shim Suk-hee^{a} Kim Gun-woo^{a} | Short-track speed skating | Mixed 2000 metre relay | 8 February |
| Gold | Lee Chae-un | Snowboarding | Men's slopestyle | 8 February |
| Gold | Lee Na-hyun | Speed skating | Women's 100 metres | 8 February |
| Gold | Choi Min-jeong | Short-track speed skating | Women's 1000 metres | 9 February |
| Gold | Jang Sung-woo | Short-track speed skating | Men's 1000 metres | 9 February |
| Gold | Kim Min-sun | Speed skating | Women's 500 metres | 9 February |
| Gold | Kim Min-ji; Lee Na-hyun; Kim Min-sun | Speed skating | Women's team sprint | 9 February |
| Gold | Ekaterina Avvakumova | Biathlon | Women's sprint | 11 February |
| Gold | Kim Geon-hui | Snowboarding | Men's halfpipe | 12 February |
| Gold | Cha Jun-hwan | Figure skating | Men's singles | 13 February |
| Gold | Kim Chae-yeon | Figure skating | Women's singles | 13 February |
| Gold | Gim Eun-ji; Kim Min-ji; Kim Su-ji; Seol Ye-eun; Seol Ye-ji | Curling | Women's tournament | 14 February |
| Silver | Gim So-hui | Alpine skiing | Women's slalom | 8 February |
| Silver | Kim Kyeong-ae; Seong Ji-hoon | Curling | Mixed doubles | 8 February |
| Silver | Park Ji-won | Short-track speed skating | Men's 500 metres | 8 February |
| Silver | Kim Gil-li | Short-track speed skating | Women's 500 metres | 8 February |
| Silver | Jung Dong-hyun | Alpine skiing | Men's slalom | 9 February |
| Silver | Park Ji-won | Short-track speed skating | Men's 1000 metres | 9 February |
| Silver | Kim Gil-li | Short-track speed skating | Women's 1000 metres | 9 February |
| Silver | Kim Min-sun | Speed skating | Women's 100 metres | 8 February |
| Silver | Lee Na-hyun | Speed skating | Women's 500 metres | 9 February |
| Silver | Kim Jun-ho; Cha Min-kyu; Cho Sang-hyeok | Speed skating | Men's team sprint | 10 February |
| Silver | Cha Min-kyu | Speed skating | Men's 1000 metres | 11 February |
| Silver | Chung Jae-won; Park Sang-eon; Lee Seung-hoon | Speed skating | Men's team pursuit | 11 February |
| Silver | Yoon Jong-hyun | Freestyle skiing | Men's big air | 12 February |
| Silver | Ko Eun-jung; Ekaterina Avvakumova; Mariya Abe; Jung Ju-mi | Biathlon | Women's relay | 13 February |
| Silver | Lee Jae-beom; Kim Hyo-jun; Pyo Jeong-min; Kim Eun-bin; Kim Jin-hun | Curling | Men's tournament | 14 February |
| Bronze | Moon Hee-sung | Freestyle skiing | Men's halfpipe | 8 February |
| Bronze | Jang Yu-jin | Freestyle skiing | Women's halfpipe | 8 February |
| Bronze | Jang Sung-woo | Short-track speed skating | Men's 500 metres | 8 February |
| Bronze | Jang Sung-woo | Short-track speed skating | Men's 1500 metres | 8 February |
| Bronze | Lee So-yeon | Short-track speed skating | Women's 500 metres | 8 February |
| Bronze | Kang Dong-hun | Snowboarding | Men's slopestyle | 8 February |
| Bronze | Kim Jun-ho | Speed skating | Men's 100 metres | 8 February |
| Bronze | Kang Dong-hun | Snowboarding | Men's big air | 10 February |
| Bronze | Kim Jun-ho | Speed skating | Men's 500 metres | 10 February |
| Bronze | Lee Na-hyun | Speed skating | Women's 1000 metres | 11 February |
| Bronze | Park Ji-woo; Jeong Yu-na; Kim Yoon-ji | Speed skating | Women's team pursuit | 11 February |
| Bronze | Shin Yeong-seop | Freestyle skiing | Men's big air | 12 February |
| Bronze | Lee Ji-o | Snowboarding | Men's halfpipe | 12 February |
| Bronze | South Korea | Ice hockey | Men's tournament | 14 February |

Medals by sport
| Sport | 1st place, gold medalist(s) | 2nd place, silver medalist(s) | 3rd place, bronze medalist(s) | Total |
| Alpine skiing | 0 | 2 | 0 | 2 |
| Biathlon | 1 | 1 | 0 | 2 |
| Curling | 1 | 2 | 0 | 3 |
| Figure skating | 2 | 0 | 0 | 2 |
| Freestyle skiing | 1 | 1 | 3 | 5 |
| Ice hockey | 0 | 0 | 1 | 1 |
| Short-track speed skating | 6 | 4 | 3 | 13 |
| Snowboarding | 2 | 0 | 3 | 5 |
| Speed skating | 3 | 5 | 4 | 12 |
| Total | 16 | 15 | 14 | 45 |

Medals by date
| Day | Date | 1st place, gold medalist(s) | 2nd place, silver medalist(s) | 3rd place, bronze medalist(s) | Total |
| 1 | 8 February | 7 | 5 | 7 | 19 |
| 2 | 9 February | 4 | 4 | 0 | 8 |
| 3 | 10 February | 0 | 1 | 2 | 3 |
| 4 | 11 February | 1 | 2 | 2 | 5 |
| 5 | 12 February | 1 | 1 | 2 | 4 |
| 6 | 13 February | 2 | 1 | 0 | 3 |
| 7 | 14 February | 1 | 1 | 1 | 3 |
| Total | | 16 | 15 | 14 | 45 |

Medals by gender
| Gender | 1st place, gold medalist(s) | 2nd place, silver medalist(s) | 3rd place, bronze medalist(s) | Total |
| Female | 9 | 6 | 4 | 19 |
| Male | 6 | 8 | 10 | 24 |
| Mixed | 1 | 1 | 0 | 2 |
| Total | 16 | 15 | 14 | 45 |

^{a} Athletes who participated in the heats only.

== Competitors ==
The following table lists the South Korean delegation per sport and gender.

| Sport | Men | Women | Total |
|---|---|---|---|
| Alpine skiing | 4 | 4 | 8 |
| Biathlon | 5 | 6 | 11 |
| Cross-country skiing | 5 | 4 | 9 |
| Curling | 6 | 6 | 12 |
| Figure skating | 2 | 2 | 4 |
| Freestyle skiing | 7 | 4 | 11 |
| Ice hockey | 23 | 23 | 46 |
| Short-track speed skating | 6 | 6 | 12 |
| Ski mountaineering | 3 | 3 | 6 |
| Snowboarding | 6 | 4 | 10 |
| Speed skating | 10 | 10 | 20 |
| Total | 77 | 72 | 149 |

== Alpine skiing ==
Men

| Athlete | Event | Run 1 | | Run 2 | | Total | |
| Athlete | Event | Time | Rank | Time | Rank | Time | Rank |
|---|---|---|---|---|---|---|---|
| Jung Dong-hyun | Slalom | 45.01 | 3 | 44.08 | 2 | 1:29.09 | 2nd place, silver medalist(s) |
| Park Je-yun | Slalom | 45.10 | 5 | 44.43 | 3 | 1:29.53 | 4 |
| Jung Min-sik | Slalom | 45.32 | 7 | 44.85 | 5 | 1:30.17 | 5 |
| Hong Dong-kwan | Slalom | 45.05 | 4 | DNF | | | |

Women

| Athlete | Event | Run 1 | | Run 2 | | Total | |
| Athlete | Event | Time | Rank | Time | Rank | Time | Rank |
|---|---|---|---|---|---|---|---|
| Gim So-hui | Slalom | 47.85 | 2 | 46.21 | 1 | 1:34.06 | 2nd place, silver medalist(s) |
| Park Seo-yun | Slalom | 50.55 | 7 | 49.50 | 6 | 1:40.05 | 6 |
| Lee Min-seo | Slalom | 51.26 | 8 | 49.96 | 7 | 1:41.22 | 7 |
| Choi Tae-heeg | Slalom | DNF | | | | | |

== Biathlon ==
Men

| Athlete | Event | Time | Misses | Rank |
|---|---|---|---|---|
| Choi Du-jin | Sprint | 31:45.1 | 3 (1+2) | 10 |
| Kang Yoon-jae | Sprint | 32:20.5 | 1 (0+1) | 11 |
| Heo Seon-hoe | Sprint | 32:57.9 | 2 (1+1) | 16 |
| Kim Seong-yun | Sprint | 33:30.2 | 5 (3+2) | 17 |
| Choi Du-jin; Kang Yoon-jae; Kim Seong-yun; Jung Min-seong | Relay | 1:28:22.5 | 4+16 | 4 |

Women

| Athlete | Event | Time | Misses | Rank |
|---|---|---|---|---|
| Ekaterina Avvakumova | Sprint | 22:45.4 | 2 (1+1) | 1st place, gold medalist(s) |
| Mariya Abe | Sprint | 24:12.1 | 1 (0+1) | 10 |
| Ko Eun-jung | Sprint | 24:22.0 | 3 (2+1) | 11 |
| Jung Ju-mi | Sprint | 25:21.5 | 5 (2+3) | 14 |
| Ko Eun-jung; Ekaterina Avvakumova; Mariya Abe; Jung Ju-mi | Relay | 1:29:27.3 | 1+17 | 2nd place, silver medalist(s) |

== Cross-country skiing ==
Distance
Men

| Athlete | Event | Total | | |
| Athlete | Event | Time | Deficit | Rank |
|---|---|---|---|---|
| Byun Ji-yeong | 10 km freestyle | 22:16.5 | +1:10.0 | 11 |
| Jeong Jong-won | 10 km freestyle | 22:26.1 | +1:19.6 | 12 |
| Lee Geon-yong | 10 km freestyle | 22:55.4 | 1:48.9 | 13 |
| Lee Joon-seo | 10 km freestyle | 22:56.3 | +1:49.8 | 14 |
| Lee Joon-seo; Byun Ji-yeong; Jeong Jong-won; Lee Geon-yong | 4 × 7.5 km relay | 1:15:27.2 | +3:17.6 | 4 |

Women

| Athlete | Event | Total | | |
| Athlete | Event | Time | Deficit | Rank |
|---|---|---|---|---|
| Han Da-som | 5 km freestyle | 13:15.5 | +1:08.0 | 11 |
| Lee Eui-jin | 5 km freestyle | 13:16.9 | +1:09.4 | 12 |
| Je Sang-mi | 5 km freestyle | 13:44.2 | +1:36.7 | 15 |
| Lee Ji-ye | 5 km freestyle | 13:47.2 | +1:39.7 | 16 |
| Lee Eui-jin; Je Sang-mi; Lee Ji-ye; Han Da-som | 4 × 5 km relay | 57:14.4 | +3:15.1 | 4 |

Sprint
Men

| Athlete | Event | Qualification | | Quarterfinals | | Semifinals | | Final | |
| Athlete | Event | Time | Rank | Time | Rank | Time | Rank | Time | Rank |
|---|---|---|---|---|---|---|---|---|---|
| Lee Geon-yong | Sprint classical | 3:11.74 | 11 Q | 3:06.90 | 3 | Did not advance | | | |
| Lee Jin-bok | Sprint classical | 3:13.55 | 13 Q | 3:07.40 | 3 | Did not advance | | | |
| Lee Joon-seo | Sprint classical | 3:16.01 | 15 Q | 3:06.73 | 4 | Did not advance | | | |
| Byun Ji-yeong | Sprint classical | 3:19.13 | 18 Q | 3:12.21 | 4 | Did not advance | | | |

Women

| Athlete | Event | Qualification | | Quarterfinals | | Semifinals | | Final | |
| Athlete | Event | Time | Rank | Time | Rank | Time | Rank | Time | Rank |
|---|---|---|---|---|---|---|---|---|---|
| Lee Eui-jin | Sprint classical | 3:58.36 | 12 Q | 3:52.65 | 3 | Did not advance | | | |
| Han Da-som | Sprint classical | 4:02.71 | 13 Q | 3:53.21 | 3 | Did not advance | | | |
| Lee Ji-ye | Sprint classical | 3:44.90 | 7 Q | 4:06.80 | 4 | Did not advance | | | |

== Curling ==
Summary

| Team | Event | Group stage | | | | | | | | | Qualification | Semifinal | Final / BM | |
| Team | Event | Opposition Score | Opposition Score | Opposition Score | Opposition Score | Opposition Score | Opposition Score | Opposition Score | Opposition Score | Rank | Opposition Score | Opposition Score | Opposition Score | Rank |
|---|---|---|---|---|---|---|---|---|---|---|---|---|---|---|
| Lee Jae-beom; Kim Hyo-jun; Pyo Jeong-min; Kim Eun-bin; Kim Jin-hun | Men's team | Philippines; W 6–1 | Kyrgyzstan; W 15–1 | Chinese Taipei; W 10–1 | Kazakhstan; W 12–2 | —N/a | | | | 1 Q | Bye | Hong Kong; W 13–2 | Philippines; L 3–5 | 2nd place, silver medalist(s) |
| Gim Eun-ji; Kim Min-ji; Kim Su-ji; Seol Ye-eun; Seol Ye-ji | Women's team | Chinese Taipei; W 11–0 | Japan; W 6–4 | Thailand; W 14–0 | Hong Kong; W 9–2 | China; W 4–3 | Kazakhstan; W 8–2 | Philippines; W 11–3 | Qatar; W | 1 Q | —N/a | Kazakhstan; W 10–2 | China; W 7–2 | 1st place, gold medalist(s) |
| Kim Kyeong-ae; Seong Ji-hoon | Mixed doubles | Philippines; L 6–12 | Qatar; W 14–1 | Kazakhstan; W 12–0 | China; L 4–6 | Kyrgyzstan; W 14–3 | —N/a | | | 3 Q | Hong Kong; W 11–4 | China; W 8–4 | Japan; L 6–7 | 2nd place, silver medalist(s) |

=== Men's tournament ===
South Korea entered a men's team.

Round robin

| Pos | Team | Skip | Pld | W | L | W–L | PF | PA | DSC | Qualification |
|---|---|---|---|---|---|---|---|---|---|---|
| 1 | South Korea | Lee Jae-beom | 4 | 4 | 0 | — | 43 | 5 | 83.43 | Semifinals |
| 2 | Philippines | Marc Pfister | 4 | 3 | 1 | — | 28 | 12 | 78.11 | Qualification |
| 3 | Kazakhstan | Abylaikhan Zhuzbay | 4 | 2 | 2 | — | 19 | 24 | 73.49 | Qualification |
| 4 | Chinese Taipei | Lin Ting-li | 4 | 1 | 3 | — | 16 | 35 | 108.93 | |
| 5 | Kyrgyzstan | Aibek Asanaliev | 4 | 0 | 4 | — | 10 | 40 | 77.01 | |

Source: Official website

Draw 1

Sunday, 9 February, 13:00

| Sheet A | 1 | 2 | 3 | 4 | 5 | 6 | 7 | 8 | Final |
| South Korea 🔨 | 0 | 2 | 0 | 1 | 2 | 0 | 1 | X | 6 |
| Philippines | 0 | 0 | 0 | 0 | 0 | 1 | 0 | X | 1 |

Draw 2

Sunday, 9 February, 21:00

| Sheet D | 1 | 2 | 3 | 4 | 5 | 6 | 7 | 8 | Final |
| Kyrgyzstan | 0 | 0 | 0 | 1 | 0 | 0 | X | X | 1 |
| South Korea 🔨 | 4 | 1 | 4 | 0 | 3 | 3 | X | X | 15 |

Draw 6

Monday, 10 February, 14:00

| Sheet B | 1 | 2 | 3 | 4 | 5 | 6 | 7 | 8 | Final |
| South Korea 🔨 | 5 | 0 | 2 | 1 | 1 | 1 | X | X | 10 |
| Chinese Taipei | 0 | 1 | 0 | 0 | 0 | 0 | X | X | 1 |

Draw 6

Tuesday, 11 February, 14:00

| Sheet C | 1 | 2 | 3 | 4 | 5 | 6 | 7 | 8 | Final |
| Kazakhstan 🔨 | 0 | 1 | 0 | 1 | 0 | 0 | 0 | X | 2 |
| South Korea | 1 | 0 | 1 | 0 | 2 | 4 | 4 | X | 12 |

Semifinal

Thursday, 13 February, 19:00

| Sheet D | 1 | 2 | 3 | 4 | 5 | 6 | 7 | 8 | Final |
| Hong Kong | 0 | 0 | 1 | 0 | 1 | 0 | X | X | 2 |
| South Korea 🔨 | 4 | 5 | 0 | 2 | 0 | 2 | X | X | 13 |

Gold Medal Game

Thursday, 14 February, 9:00

| Sheet B | 1 | 2 | 3 | 4 | 5 | 6 | 7 | 8 | Final |
| South Korea 🔨 | 0 | 0 | 1 | 0 | 1 | 1 | 0 | 0 | 3 |
| Philippines | 0 | 1 | 0 | 2 | 0 | 0 | 1 | 1 | 5 |

=== Women's tournament ===
South Korea entered a women's team.

Round robin

| Pos | Team | Skip | Pld | W | L | W–L | PF | PA | DSC | Qualification |
|---|---|---|---|---|---|---|---|---|---|---|
| 1 | South Korea | Gim Eun-ji | 8 | 8 | 0 | — | 63 | 14 | 45.90 | Semifinals |
| 2 | China | Wang Rui | 8 | 7 | 1 | — | 85 | 21 | 38.69 | Semifinals |
| 3 | Japan | Yuina Miura | 8 | 6 | 2 | — | 68 | 30 | 58.25 | Semifinals |
| 4 | Kazakhstan | Angelina Ebauyer | 8 | 5 | 3 | — | 55 | 39 | 54.81 | Semifinals |
| 5 | Philippines | Kathleen Dubberstein | 8 | 4 | 4 | — | 61 | 36 | 85.56 | |
| 6 | Hong Kong | Hung Ling Yue | 8 | 3 | 5 | — | 44 | 45 | 115.69 | |
| 7 | Chinese Taipei | Yang Ko | 8 | 2 | 6 | — | 29 | 75 | 107.27 | |
| 8 | Thailand | Phichayathida Jaosap | 8 | 1 | 7 | — | 19 | 91 | 128.48 | |
| 9 | Qatar | Amna Al-Qaet | 8 | 0 | 8 | — | 11 | 84 | 180.65 | |

Source: Official website

Draw 1

Sunday, 9 February, 9:00

| Sheet A | 1 | 2 | 3 | 4 | 5 | 6 | 7 | 8 | Final |
| Chinese Taipei | 0 | 0 | 0 | 0 | 0 | 0 | X | X | 0 |
| South Korea 🔨 | 2 | 2 | 2 | 3 | 1 | 1 | X | X | 11 |

Draw 2

Sunday, 9 February, 17:00

| Sheet B | 1 | 2 | 3 | 4 | 5 | 6 | 7 | 8 | Final |
| South Korea 🔨 | 1 | 0 | 0 | 2 | 1 | 0 | 2 | X | 6 |
| Japan | 0 | 0 | 1 | 0 | 0 | 3 | 0 | X | 4 |

Draw 3

Monday, 10 February, 9:00

| Sheet E | 1 | 2 | 3 | 4 | 5 | 6 | 7 | 8 | Final |
| Thailand | 0 | 0 | 0 | 0 | 0 | 0 | X | X | 0 |
| South Korea 🔨 | 5 | 2 | 2 | 2 | 2 | 1 | X | X | 14 |

Draw 4

Monday, 10 February, 19:00

| Sheet C | 1 | 2 | 3 | 4 | 5 | 6 | 7 | 8 | Final |
| South Korea 🔨 | 1 | 0 | 1 | 1 | 3 | 3 | 0 | X | 9 |
| Hong Kong | 0 | 1 | 0 | 0 | 0 | 0 | 1 | X | 2 |

Draw 6

Tuesday, 11 February, 19:00

| Sheet B | 1 | 2 | 3 | 4 | 5 | 6 | 7 | 8 | Final |
| China 🔨 | 0 | 1 | 1 | 0 | 0 | 0 | 1 | 0 | 3 |
| South Korea | 0 | 0 | 0 | 1 | 1 | 1 | 0 | 1 | 4 |

Draw 7

Wednesday, 12 February, 9:00

| Sheet D | 1 | 2 | 3 | 4 | 5 | 6 | 7 | 8 | Final |
| South Korea | 2 | 0 | 3 | 0 | 2 | 1 | X | X | 8 |
| Kazakhstan 🔨 | 0 | 1 | 0 | 1 | 0 | 0 | X | X | 2 |

Draw 8

Wednesday, 12 February, 19:00

| Sheet C | 1 | 2 | 3 | 4 | 5 | 6 | 7 | 8 | Final |
| Philippines | 0 | 2 | 0 | 0 | 1 | 0 | X | X | 3 |
| South Korea 🔨 | 2 | 0 | 4 | 3 | 0 | 2 | X | X | 11 |

Draw 9

Thursday, 13 February, 9:00

| Sheet A | 1 | 2 | 3 | 4 | 5 | 6 | 7 | 8 | Final |
| South Korea 🔨 | 4 | 1 | | | | | | | W |
| Qatar | 0 | 0 | | | | | | | L |

- Qatar forfeited the game after end 2 as they did not have enough remaining members to continue to play.

Semifinal

Thursday, 13 February, 19:00

| Sheet C | 1 | 2 | 3 | 4 | 5 | 6 | 7 | 8 | Final |
| Kazakhstan | 0 | 1 | 0 | 1 | 0 | 0 | X | X | 2 |
| South Korea 🔨 | 5 | 0 | 3 | 0 | 1 | 1 | X | X | 10 |

Gold Medal Game

Friday, 14 February, 13:00

| Sheet C | 1 | 2 | 3 | 4 | 5 | 6 | 7 | 8 | Final |
| China | 0 | 0 | 2 | 0 | 0 | 0 | 0 | X | 2 |
| South Korea 🔨 | 1 | 2 | 0 | 1 | 0 | 1 | 2 | X | 7 |

=== Mixed doubles tournament ===
South Korea entered a mixed doubles pair.

Round robin

| Pos | Team | Athletes | Pld | W | L | W–L | PF | PA | DSC | Qualification |
|---|---|---|---|---|---|---|---|---|---|---|
| 1 | China | Han / Wang | 5 | 5 | 0 | — | 44 | 19 | 37.46 | Semifinals |
| 2 | Philippines | Dubberstein / Pfister | 5 | 4 | 1 | — | 50 | 22 | 58.24 | Qualification |
| 3 | South Korea | Kim / Seong | 5 | 3 | 2 | — | 50 | 22 | 47.83 | Qualification |
| 4 | Kazakhstan | Seitzhanova / Nadirbayev | 5 | 2 | 3 | — | 26 | 43 | 55.33 | |
| 5 | Kyrgyzstan | Asanbaeva / Abykeev | 5 | 1 | 4 | — | 21 | 50 | 114.23 | |
| 6 | Qatar | Al-Abdulla / Al-Yafei | 5 | 0 | 5 | — | 15 | 50 | 98.31 | |

Source: Official website

Draw 1

Tuesday, 4 February, 10:00

| Sheet D | 1 | 2 | 3 | 4 | 5 | 6 | 7 | 8 | Final |
| Philippines | 5 | 0 | 2 | 0 | 0 | 0 | 5 | X | 12 |
| South Korea 🔨 | 0 | 1 | 0 | 1 | 3 | 1 | 0 | X | 6 |

Draw 2

Tuesday, 4 February, 14:00

| Sheet E | 1 | 2 | 3 | 4 | 5 | 6 | 7 | 8 | Final |
| South Korea 🔨 | 1 | 2 | 3 | 0 | 5 | 3 | X | X | 14 |
| Qatar | 0 | 0 | 0 | 1 | 0 | 0 | X | X | 1 |

Draw 3

Wednesday, 5 February, 10:00

| Sheet A | 1 | 2 | 3 | 4 | 5 | 6 | 7 | 8 | Final |
| Kazakhstan | 0 | 0 | 0 | 0 | 0 | 0 | X | X | 0 |
| South Korea 🔨 | 6 | 1 | 1 | 2 | 1 | 1 | X | X | 12 |

Draw 6

Thursday, 6 February, 10:00

| Sheet B | 1 | 2 | 3 | 4 | 5 | 6 | 7 | 8 | Final |
| South Korea | 1 | 0 | 1 | 0 | 1 | 0 | 1 | X | 4 |
| China 🔨 | 0 | 2 | 0 | 1 | 0 | 3 | 0 | X | 6 |

Draw 8

Thursday, 6 February, 18:00

| Sheet C | 1 | 2 | 3 | 4 | 5 | 6 | 7 | 8 | Final |
| South Korea 🔨 | 0 | 3 | 5 | 1 | 0 | 3 | 2 | X | 14 |
| Kyrgyzstan | 1 | 0 | 0 | 0 | 2 | 0 | 0 | X | 3 |

Qualification

Friday, 7 February, 9:00

| Sheet B | 1 | 2 | 3 | 4 | 5 | 6 | 7 | 8 | Final |
| Hong Kong 🔨 | 0 | 0 | 0 | 3 | 0 | 1 | 0 | X | 4 |
| South Korea | 1 | 3 | 2 | 0 | 2 | 0 | 3 | X | 11 |

Semifinal

Friday, 7 February, 13:00

| Sheet C | 1 | 2 | 3 | 4 | 5 | 6 | 7 | 8 | Final |
| China 🔨 | 0 | 2 | 0 | 0 | 0 | 2 | 0 | 0 | 4 |
| South Korea | 1 | 0 | 3 | 1 | 1 | 0 | 1 | 1 | 8 |

Gold medal game

Saturday, 8 February, 9:00

| Sheet C | 1 | 2 | 3 | 4 | 5 | 6 | 7 | 8 | Final |
| South Korea | 2 | 0 | 1 | 0 | 0 | 1 | 2 | 0 | 6 |
| Japan 🔨 | 0 | 2 | 0 | 2 | 1 | 0 | 0 | 2 | 7 |

== Figure skating ==
Singles

| Athlete(s) | Event | SP | | FS | | Total | |
| Athlete(s) | Event | Points | Rank | Points | Rank | Points | Rank |
|---|---|---|---|---|---|---|---|
| Cha Jun-hwan | Men's | 94.09 | 2 | 187.60 | 1 | 281.69 | 1st place, gold medalist(s) |
| Kim Hyun-gyeom | Men's | 58.22 | 10 | WD | | | |
| Kim Chae-yeon | Women's | 71.88 | 2 | 147.56 | 1 | 219.44 | 1st place, gold medalist(s) |
| Kim Seo-young | Women's | 51.23 | 7 | 99.31 | 6 | 150.54 | 7 |

== Freestyle skiing ==
Half pipe, Slopestyle and Big Air
Men

| Athlete | Event | Final | | | | |
| Athlete | Event | Run 1 | Run 2 | Run 3 | Best | Rank |
|---|---|---|---|---|---|---|
| Yoon Jong-hyun | Big air | 88.25 | 81.25 | DNI | 169.50 | 2nd place, silver medalist(s) |
| Shin Yeong-seop | Big air | 67.50 | 77.25 | 88.00 | 165.25 | 3rd place, bronze medalist(s) |
| Lee Seo-jun | Big air | 57.25 | DNS | DNS | 57.25 | 7 |
| Lee Seung-hun | Halfpipe | 96.00 | DNI | 97.50 | 97.50 | 1st place, gold medalist(s) |
| Moon Hee-sung | Halfpipe | 88.50 | DNI | DNI | 88.50 | 3rd place, bronze medalist(s) |
| Shin Dong-ho | Halfpipe | 77.25 | DNI | DNI | 77.25 | 7 |
| Shin Yeong-seop | Slopestyle | 75.50 | DNI | DNI | 75.50 | 5 |
| Yoon Jong-hyun | Slopestyle | 62.75 | DNI | DNI | 62.75 | 6 |
| Lee Seo-jun | Slopestyle | 50.00 | DNS | DNS | 50.00 | 9 |

Women

| Athlete | Event | Final | | | | |
| Athlete | Event | Run 1 | Run 2 | Run 3 | Best | Rank |
|---|---|---|---|---|---|---|
| Jang Yu-jin | Halfpipe | 80.75 | 83.75 | 85.00 | 85.00 | 3rd place, bronze medalist(s) |
| Shin Hye-rin | Halfpipe | 69.50 | 71.00 | 72.00 | 72.00 | 4 |
| Lee So-young | Halfpipe | 62.25 | 63.00 | DNI | 63.00 | 5 |
| Lim Yeon-ju | Halfpipe | 58.25 | 59.50 | DNI | 59.50 | 6 |

== Ice hockey ==
=== Men's tournament ===
South Korea qualified a men's hockey team. The South Korean team qualified after being ranked as one of the top 12 teams in Asia on the IIHF World Ranking as of May 2024.

Group stage

| Pos | Team | Pld | W | OW | OL | L | GF | GA | GD | Pts | Qualification |
|---|---|---|---|---|---|---|---|---|---|---|---|
| 1 | Kazakhstan | 5 | 5 | 0 | 0 | 0 | 41 | 3 | +38 | 15 | Quarterfinals |
| 2 | South Korea | 5 | 3 | 1 | 0 | 1 | 36 | 10 | +26 | 11 | Quarterfinals |
| 3 | Japan | 5 | 3 | 0 | 0 | 2 | 28 | 11 | +17 | 9 | Quarterfinals |
| 4 | China | 5 | 2 | 0 | 1 | 2 | 20 | 14 | +6 | 7 | Quarterfinals |
| 5 | Chinese Taipei | 5 | 1 | 0 | 0 | 4 | 4 | 52 | −48 | 3 | Quarterfinals |
| 6 | Thailand | 5 | 0 | 0 | 0 | 5 | 2 | 41 | −39 | 0 | Quarterfinals |

Source: OCA

| 4 February; 20:00 | China | 5–6 OT (2–1, 2–2, 1–2) (OT: 0–1) | South Korea | Harbin Ice Hockey Arena, Harbin; Attendance: 2,916 |

Game reference

Chen Shifeng
Goalies
Lee Yeon-seung
Referees:
Anton Boryayev (KAZ)
Konstantin Chubenko (KAZ)

| | 0–1 | 06:32 – Lee C. (Kim S.W., Nam) |
| Zhang J. (Guo, Zhang P.) – 09:15 | 1–1 |
| Yan (Zhang J., Zhang Z.) – 17:36 | 2–1 |
| Zheng (Wang, Chen Z.) – 24:13 | 3–1 |
| Guo (Zhang Z., Zhang P.) – 24:43 | 4–1 |
| | 4–2 | 34:31 – Ahn (Lee C., Kim S.W.) |
| | 4–3 | 36:17 – Kim S.Y. (Kim S.H., Kim W.) |
| | 4–4 | 47:53 – Kim S.Y. (Kong, Kim S.W.) (PP) |
| Yu J. – 52:50 | 5–4 |
| | 5–5 | 55:00 – Lee C. (Kang Y., Nam) (PP) |
| | 5–6 | 64:15 – Kim S.W. (Nam, Lee C.) |

12 min
Penalties
4 min
14
Shots
47

| 5 February; 16:00 | South Korea | 14–1 (4–0, 6–0, 4–1) | Chinese Taipei | Harbin Ice Hockey Arena, Harbin; Attendance: 1,597 |

Game reference

Ha Jung-ho
Goalies
Lee Yi-cheng
Referees:
Liu Jiaqi (CHN)
Faris Hakimin Yusoff (MAS)

| Kong (Kim S.H.) – 05:41 | 1–0 |
| Kim S.W. (Ahn, Lee C.) – 11:14 | 2–0 |
| Oh (Kong, Kim G.) – 11:38 | 3–0 |
| Kim S.Y. (Kong, Kim W.) – 17:19 | 4–0 |
| Kim S.W. (Lee C., Nam) – 20:09 | 5–0 |
| Kim S.Y. (Kang M., Kim W.) – 23:20 | 6–0 |
| Ahn (Kim S.W., Lee M.J.) – 24:40 | 7–0 |
| Oh (Lee C., Kim S.W.) – 32:28 | 8–0 |
| Lee C. (Kim S.W., Ahn) – 37:25 | 9–0 |
| Ahn (Lee C., Kim S.W.) – 37:45 | 10–0 |
| Nam (Ahn, Kim S.W.) – 40:22 | 11–0 |
| | 11–1 | 40:58 – Peng (Wen) |
| Lee C. (Kim S.W., Ahn) – 49:42 | 12–1 |
| Kim S.W. (Lee C., Kong) – 53:41 | 13–1 |
| Kwon (Kim S.Y., Oh) – 57:32 | 14–1 |

2 min
Penalties
6 min
65
Shots
7

| 7 February; 12:30 | South Korea | 5–2 (1–1, 3–1, 1–0) | Japan | Harbin Sport University Stadium, Harbin; Attendance: 1,044 |

Game reference

Lee Yeon-seung
Goalies
Yuta Narisawa
Referees:
Konstantin Chubenko (KAZ)
Liu Jiaqi (CHN)

| | 0–1 | 02:25 – Okubo (Kobayashi, H. Sato) (PP) |
| Lee C. (Ahn, Kim S.W.) – 06:06 | 1–1 |
| Kim S.W. (Ahn, Lee C.) – 20:27 | 2–1 |
| | 2–2 | 21:57 – Irikura (Suzuki, Isogai) |
| Kim S.Y. (Lee H., Lee S.) – 27:24 | 3–2 |
| Kim S.W. (Lee S., Lee C.) – 36:41 | 4–2 |
| Kang Y. (Oh, Lee C.) – 58:32 | 5–2 |

6 min
Penalties
4 min
29
Shots
31

| 8 February; 16:00 | Thailand | 0–10 (0–5, 0–1, 0–4) | South Korea | Harbin Ice Hockey Arena, Harbin; Attendance: 1,821 |

Game reference

Dominik Vollenweider
Goalies
Ha Jung-ho
Referees:
Li Ho Ching (HKG)
Shen Yen-chin (TPE)

| 0–1 | 03:25 – Kim S.Y. (Lim, Lee M.J.) |
| 0–2 | 05:57 – Kim S.W. (Lee C., Lim) |
| 0–3 | 08:56 – Jeon (Kwon, Nam) |
| 0–4 | 12:02 – Lee H. (Lee M.J., Kang Y.) |
| 0–5 | 16:43 – Kang M. (Kim S.Y., Kim S.H.) |
| 0–6 | 35:51 – Lee C. (Kim S.W., Ahn) |
| 0–7 | 42:45 – Kim S.W. (Kim W., Lee C.) |
| 0–8 | 52:49 – Kim S.Y. (Kong, Kang M.) |
| 0–9 | 55:01 – Ahn (Kim S.W., Oh) |
| 0–10 | 57:10 – Lee C. (Nam, Kim S.W.) (PP) |

4 min
Penalties
0 min
5
Shots
84

| 10 February; 12:00 | Kazakhstan | 2–1 (0–1, 0–0, 2–0) | South Korea | Harbin Ice Hockey Arena, Harbin; Attendance: 2,079 |

Game reference

Andrey Shutov
Goalies
Lee Yeon-seung
Referees:
Liu Jiaqi (CHN)
Shen Yen-chin (TPE)

| | 0–1 | 11:08 – Kang Y. (Nam, Lee C.) (PP) |
| Likhotnikov (Savitskiy, Daniyar) (PP) – 44:58 | 1–1 |
| Starchenko (Rymarev, Panyukov) (PP) – 58:42 | 2–1 |

4 min
Penalties
10 min
32
Shots
26

Quarterfinals

| 11 February; 16:00 | South Korea | 20–0 (6–0, 11–0, 3–0) | Kyrgyzstan | Harbin Sport University Stadium, Harbin; Attendance: 1,060 |

Game reference

Ha Jung-ho
Goalies
Artem Vasilev
Arslan Maraimbekov
Referees:
Timur Morev (KAZ)
Shen Yen-chin (TPE)

| Kang M. (Kim S.H., Kim D.) – 02:47 | 1–0 |
| Kim S.Y. (Kang M., Kim S.H.) – 06:01 | 2–0 |
| Lee H. (Oh, Kong) – 13:21 | 3–0 |
| Kim S.Y. (Kim D., Kang M.) – 14:55 | 4–0 |
| Kang Y. (Lee H., Kong) – 17:38 | 5–0 |
| Lee S. (Kim S.Y.) – 18:38 | 6–0 |
| Kim S.H. (Kang M., Kim S.Y.) – 22:35 | 7–0 |
| Lee M.Y. (Kwon, Jeon) – 24:14 | 8–0 |
| Kwon – 27:23 | 9–0 |
| Lee C. (Kim S.W., Ahn) – 27:46 | 10–0 |
| Lee C. (Ahn, Kim S.W.) – 32:13 | 11–0 |
| Lee C. (Kim S.W., Nam) – 32:47 | 12–0 |
| Kang M. (Kim S.H.) – 34:16 | 13–0 |
| Kang M. (Kim S.H., Kim S.Y.) – 34:40 | 14–0 |
| Jeon (Kwon) – 34:50 | 15–0 |
| Ahn (Kim S.W.) (PP) – 35:26 | 16–0 |
| Lee H. (Kong, Ahn) – 36:50 | 17–0 |
| Lee S. (Kim S.Y., Kim S.H.) – 51:58 | 18–0 |
| Kim S.W. (Nam, Ahn) – 54:18 | 19–0 |
| Kim S.Y. (Kong, Lee S.) – 56:56 | 20–0 |

4 min
Penalties
4 min
55
Shots
11

Semifinals

| 13 February; 14:00 | South Korea | 3–4 GWS (2–1, 1–1, 0–1) (OT: 0–0) (SO: 0–1) | Japan | Harbin Ice Hockey Arena, Harbin; Attendance: 2,582 |

Game reference

Lee Yeon-seung
Goalies
Yuta Narisawa
Referees:
Konstantin Chubenko (KAZ)
Anton Boryayev (KAZ)

| Ahn (Kim S.W., Kim W.) – 03:12 | 1–0 |
| Kim S.Y. (Kang M., Kong) (PP) – 14:25 | 2–0 |
| | 2–1 | 19:21 – Kobayashi (Nakajima, Suzuki) |
| Kim S.H. – 25:29 | 3–1 |
| | 3–2 | 28:05 – Isogai (Yoneyama, Nakajima) (PP) |
| | 3–3 | 58:45 – Nakajima (Yoneyama, H. Sato) |

Ahn (miss)
Kim S.W. (miss)
Kong (miss)
Shootout
Takagi
(miss) Kobayashi
(miss) Irikura
Suzuki
8 min
Penalties
10 min
32
Shots
29

Bronze medal game

| 14 February; 10:00 | South Korea | 5–2 (0–1, 3–0, 2–1) | China | Harbin Ice Hockey Arena, Harbin; Attendance: 3,035 |

Game reference

Lee Yeon-seung
Goalies
Chen Shifeng
Referees:
Anton Boryayev (KAZ)
Timur Morev (KAZ)

| | 0–1 | 07:27 – Li Z. (Hou, Yu J.) |
| Oh (Kang Y.) – 26:27 | 1–1 |
| Kim S.Y. (Lee H., Kim W.) – 35:30 | 2–1 |
| Kong (Kim S.W., Kang M.) – 39:46 | 3–1 |
| | 3–2 | 42:00 – Zhang Z. (Yan) |
| Lee C. (Lee S.) (PP) – 43:06 | 4–2 |
| Lee S. (Lee C., Ahn) (PP) – 48:10 | 5–2 |

12 min
Penalties
14 min
40
Shots
22

=== Women's tournament ===
South Korea qualified a women's hockey team. The South Korean team qualified after being ranked as one of the top eight teams in Asia on the IIHF World Ranking as of May 2024.

Preliminary round

| Pos | Team | Pld | W | OW | OL | L | GF | GA | GD | Pts | Qualification |
|---|---|---|---|---|---|---|---|---|---|---|---|
| 1 | Kazakhstan | 4 | 3 | 1 | 0 | 0 | 27 | 1 | +26 | 11 | Final round |
| 2 | South Korea | 4 | 3 | 0 | 1 | 0 | 22 | 3 | +19 | 10 | Final round |
| 3 | Chinese Taipei | 4 | 2 | 0 | 0 | 2 | 13 | 10 | +3 | 6 | |
| 4 | Thailand | 4 | 1 | 0 | 0 | 3 | 3 | 25 | −22 | 3 | |
| 5 | Hong Kong | 4 | 0 | 0 | 0 | 4 | 2 | 28 | −26 | 0 | |

Source: OCA

| 4 February; 15:30 | South Korea | 8–0 (2–0, 3–0, 3–0) | Hong Kong | Harbin Sport University Stadium, Harbin; Attendance: 1,121 |

Game reference

Kim Yeon-ju
Bae Jeong-yeon
Goalies
Mok Hei Lam
Referees:
Song Meina (CHN)
Wan Mei Wah (MAS)

| Park Ji-Y. (Lee S., Eom) (PP) – 07:04 | 1–0 |
| Kim S. (Park J.A., Lee E. Jr.) – 12:24 | 2–0 |
| Choi (Jung S., Kim M.) – 22:08 | 3–0 |
| Lee E. Jr. (Kim D.) – 28:08 | 4–0 |
| Park J.A. (SH) – 36:28 | 5–0 |
| Lee E. Sr. (Lee E. Jr., Kim S.) – 40:28 | 6–0 |
| Eom (Choi, Park Ji-Y.) – 48:48 | 7–0 |
| Kim S. (Lee E. Jr.) (PP) – 56:33 | 8–0 |

2 min
Penalties
16 min
76
Shots
5

| 6 February; 15:30 | South Korea | 11–0 (2–0, 5–0, 4–0) | Thailand | Harbin Sport University Stadium, Harbin; Attendance: 1,014 |

Game reference

Kim Yeon-ju
Bae Jeong-yeon
Goalies
Thamida Kunthadapakorn
Wilaksaya Watthanakulcharoenchai
Referees:
Liu Lu (CHN)
Song Meina (CHN)

| Jung S. (Choi, Park Ju-Y.) – 02:12 | 1–0 |
| Eom (Choi) – 05:16 | 2–0 |
| Kim S. (Kim D., Park J.A.) – 22:31 | 3–0 |
| Choi (Lee E. Sr., Kim S.) (PP) – 32:54 | 4–0 |
| Eom (Choi) – 34:06 | 5–0 |
| Lee E. Sr. (Park J.A., Lee E. Jr.) – 36:29 | 6–0 |
| Park Y. (Kang N., Song) – 38:54 | 7–0 |
| Lee E. Jr. (Lee E. Sr., Park J.A.) – 45:12 | 8–0 |
| Park M. (Jung Y., Kang N.) – 47:59 | 9–0 |
| Park Ji-Y. (Eom, Lee S.) – 53:45 | 10–0 |
| Han Y. (Han S., Kim S.) – 55:44 | 11–0 |

6 min
Penalties
6 min
72
Shots
1

| 8 February; 15:30 | Chinese Taipei | 2–3 (0–1, 1–0, 1–2) | South Korea | Harbin Sport University Stadium, Harbin; Attendance: 1,067 |

Game reference

Hsu Tzu-ting
Goalies
Kim Yeon-ju
Referees:
Liu Lu (CHN)
Wan Mei Wah (MAS)

| | 0–1 | 06:55 – Park Ji-Y. (Lee E. Jr., Kim D.) |
| Yeh H. (Lin Y.) – 28:04 | 1–1 |
| | 1–2 | 47:27 – Jung S. (Kang N., Choi) |
| Huang Y. (Chang E.N., Wu) – 49:33 | 2–2 |
| | 2–3 | 59:45 – Kim S. (Park J.A., Lee E. Jr.) (PP) |

12 min
Penalties
0 min
7
Shots
76

| 9 February; 15:30 | South Korea | 0–1 OT (0–0, 0–0, 0–0) (OT: 0–1) | Kazakhstan | Harbin Sport University Stadium, Harbin; Attendance: 1,033 |

Game reference
| Kim Yeon-ju | Goalies | Arina Chshyokolova | Referees: Liu Lu (CHN); Miyuki Nakayama (JPN) |
| 0–1 / 62:01 – Shegay | | | Referees: Liu Lu (CHN); Miyuki Nakayama (JPN) |
| 0 min | Penalties | 6 min | Referees: Liu Lu (CHN); Miyuki Nakayama (JPN) |
| 21 | Shots | 16 | Referees: Liu Lu (CHN); Miyuki Nakayama (JPN) |

Final round

| Pos | Team | Pld | W | OTW | OTL | L | GF | GA | GD | Pts | |
|---|---|---|---|---|---|---|---|---|---|---|---|
| 1 | Japan | 3 | 3 | 0 | 0 | 0 | 18 | 1 | +17 | 9 | Gold Medal |
| 2 | Kazakhstan | 3 | 2 | 0 | 0 | 1 | 5 | 5 | 0 | 6 | Silver Medal |
| 3 | China | 3 | 1 | 0 | 0 | 2 | 4 | 11 | −7 | 3 | Bronze Medal |
| 4 | South Korea | 3 | 0 | 0 | 0 | 3 | 1 | 11 | −10 | 0 | |

Source: Harbin2025

| 12 February; 14:00 | China | 2–1 (1–0, 0–1, 1–0) | South Korea | Harbin Sport University Stadium, Harbin; Attendance: 1,187 |

Game reference

Lai Guimin
Goalies
Kim Yeon-ju
Referees:
Miyuki Nakayama (JPN)
Wan Mei Wah (MAS)

| Wu (Wang J.) – 10:50 | 1–0 |
| | 1–1 | 25:44 – Eom (Park Ji-Y.) |
| Fang (Wang J., Kong) – 48:38 | 2–1 |

9 min
Penalties
6 min
24
Shots
24

| 13 February; 10:00 | Japan | 6–0 (3–0, 2–0, 1–0) | South Korea | Harbin Sport University Stadium, Harbin; Attendance: 979 |

Game reference

Haruka Kuromaru
Goalies
Kim Yeon-ju
Park Jong-ju
Referees:
Liu Lu (CHN)
Song Meina (CHN)

| Ukita (Sato) – 10:47 | 1–0 |
| Ukita (Koyama, Ito) – 15:12 | 2–0 |
| Wajima (Ito, Hosoyamada) – 18:17 | 3–0 |
| Maeda (Wajima, Koike) – 24:49 | 4–0 |
| Wajima (Maeda, Koike) – 32:40 | 5–0 |
| Maeda (Miura, Koike) – 53:44 | 6–0 |

4 min
Penalties
2 min
45
Shots
9

| 14 February; 10:00 | South Korea | 0–3 (0–1, 0–0, 0–2) | Kazakhstan | Harbin Sport University Stadium, Harbin; Attendance: 862 |

Game reference

Kim Yeon-ju
Goalies
Arina Chshyokolova
Referees:
Song Meina (CHN)
Wan Mei Wah (MAS)

| 0–1 | 05:58 – Aldabergenova (Shegay, Tursynova) (PP) |
| 0–2 | 43:23 – Butorina |
| 0–3 | 53:30 – Moldabay |

11 min
Penalties
10 min
23
Shots
22

== Short-track speed skating ==
Men

| Athlete | Event | Heat | | Quarterfinal | | Semifinal | | Final | |
| Athlete | Event | Time | Rank | Time | Rank | Time | Rank | Time | Rank |
|---|---|---|---|---|---|---|---|---|---|
| Jang Sung-woo | 500 m | 42.258 | 1 Q | 40.735 | 2 Q | 40.703 | 3 FA | 41.442 | 3rd place, bronze medalist(s) |
| Park Ji-won | 500 m | 41.461 | 1 Q | 41.240 | 1 Q | 41.329 | 2 FA | 41.398 | 2nd place, silver medalist(s) |
| Kim Tae-sung | 500 m | 41.404 | 2 Q | 40.509 GR | 1 Q | 40.509 | 1 FA | PEN | 5 |
| Park Ji-won | 1000 m | 1:25.419 | 1 Q | 1:26.657 | 2 Q | 1:26.625 | 2 FA | 1:28.829 | 2nd place, silver medalist(s) |
| Jang Sung-woo | 1000 m | 1:26.699 | 1 Q | 1:27.208 | 2 Q | 1:26.116 | 2 FA | 1:28.304 | 1st place, gold medalist(s) |
| Kim Gun-woo | 1000 m | 1:29.187 | 1 Q | 1:28.269 | 2 Q | 1:26.753 | 5 FB | Did not start | |
| Park Ji-won | 1500 m | —N/a | | 2:21.118 | 1 Q | 2:18.000 | 1 FA | 2:16.927 | 1st place, gold medalist(s) |
| Jang Sung-woo | 1500 m | —N/a | | 2:19.505 | 1 Q | 2:25.937 | 2 FA | 2:17.057 | 3rd place, bronze medalist(s) |
| Kim Gun-woo | 1500 m | —N/a | | 2:24.076 | 1 Q | 2:18.133 | 2 FA | 2:17.160 | 4 |
| Park Ji-won; Jang Sung-woo; Kim Gun-woo; Park Jang-hyuk; Lee Jung-su^{[a]} | 5000 m relay | —N/a | | | | 6:53.912 | 1 FA | PEN | 4 |

Women

| Athlete | Event | Heat | | Quarterfinal | | Semifinal | | Final | |
| Athlete | Event | Time | Rank | Time | Rank | Time | Rank | Time | Rank |
|---|---|---|---|---|---|---|---|---|---|
| Lee So-yeon | 500 m | 43.817 | 2 Q | 43.288 | 2 Q | 43.874 | 2 FA | 43.203 | 3rd place, bronze medalist(s) |
| Choi Min-jeong | 500 m | 43.321 GR | 1 Q | 43.318 | 1 Q | 42.885 GR | 1 FA | 43.016 | 1st place, gold medalist(s) |
| Kim Gil-li | 500 m | 44.644 | 1 Q | 44.498 | 2 Q | 43.867 | 1 FA | 43.105 | 2nd place, silver medalist(s) |
| Shim Suk-hee | 1000 m | 1:35.014 | 1 Q | 1:34.926 | 1 Q | 1:30.017 | 2 FA | 1:29.994 | 4 |
| Kim Gil-li | 1000 m | 1:37.829 | 1 Q | 2:09.121 | 4 ADV | 1:31.194 | 1 FA | 1:29.739 | 2nd place, silver medalist(s) |
| Choi Min-jeong | 1000 m | 1:31.643 | 1 Q | 1:31.214 | 1 Q | 1:29.835 GR | 1 FA | 1:29.637 GR | 1st place, gold medalist(s) |
| Kim Gil-li | 1500 m | —N/a | | 2:43.771 | 1 Q | 2:23.375 | 2 FA | 2:23.781 | 1st place, gold medalist(s) |
| Choi Min-jeong | 1500 m | —N/a | | 2:31.808 | 1 Q | 2:23.351 | 1 FA | 2:24.133 | 4 |
| Shim Suk-hee | 1500 m | —N/a | | 2:34.927 | 2 Q | 2:23.492 | 3 FA | 2:24.201 | 5 |
| Kim Geon-hee; Kim Gil-li; Lee So-yeon; Choi Min-jeong; Noh Do-hee^{[a]} Shim Suk-hee^{[a]} | 3000 m relay | —N/a | | | | 4:13.944 | 1 FA | 4:16.683 | 4 |

Mixed

| Athlete | Event | Quarterfinal | | Semifinal | | Final | |
| Athlete | Event | Time | Rank | Time | Rank | Time | Rank |
|---|---|---|---|---|---|---|---|
| Kim Gil-li; Choi Min-jeong; Park Ji-won; Kim Tae-sung; Jang Sung-woo^{[a]} Noh Do-hee^{[a]} Shim Suk-hee^{[a]} Kim Gun-woo^{[a]} | 2000 m relay | 2:43.938 GR | 1 Q | 2:39.319 GR | 1 FA | 2:41.534 | 1st place, gold medalist(s) |

Qualification legend: FA - Qualify to medal final; FB - Qualify to consolation final ^{a} Skaters who participated in the heats only.

== Ski mountaineering ==
| Athlete | Event | Qualification | | Semifinals | | Final | |
| Athlete | Event | Time | Rank | Time | Rank | Time | Rank |
|---|---|---|---|---|---|---|---|
| Jung Jae-won | Men's sprint | 2:54.10 | 5 Q | 2:48.57 | 3 | Did not advance | |
| Gu Gyo-jeong | Men's sprint | 3:35.64 | 10 Q | 4:29.78 | 6 | Did not advance | |
| Oh Young-hwan | Men's sprint | 3:52.79 | 17 | Did not advance | | | |
| Jeong Ye-ji | Women's sprint | 3:46.09 | 8 Q | 3:46.98 | 5 | Did not advance | |
| Kim Ha-na | Women's sprint | 5:06.90 | 12 Q | Did not finish | | Did not advance | |
| Kim Mee-jin | Women's sprint | 5:30.06 | 13 | Did not advance | | | |
| Jeong Ye-ji; Jung Jae-won | Mixed relay | 16:30.35 | 7 Q | —N/a | | 33:43.24 | 7 |
| Kim Mee-jin; Gu Gyo-jeong | Mixed relay | 19:28.62 | 11 Q | —N/a | | 38:25.41 | 10 |
| Kim Ha-na; Oh Young-hwan | Mixed relay | Did not finish | | —N/a | | Did not advance | |

== Snowboarding ==
Men

| Athlete | Event | Qualification | | | | Final | | | | |
| Athlete | Event | Run 1 | Run 2 | Best | Rank | Run 1 | Run 2 | Run 3 | Best | Rank |
|---|---|---|---|---|---|---|---|---|---|---|
| Kang Dong-hun | Big air | —N/a | | | | 77.75 | 80.25 | 78.50 | 158.75 | 3rd place, bronze medalist(s) |
| Lee Dong-heon | Big air | —N/a | | | | Did not start | | | | |
| Kim Geon-hui | Halfpipe | 78.00 | DNI | 78.00 | 1st place, gold medalist(s) | Cancelled | | | | |
| Lee Ji-o | Halfpipe | 10.75 | 69.75 | 69.75 | 3rd place, bronze medalist(s) | Cancelled | | | | |
| Kim Kang-san | Halfpipe | 59.75 | DNI | 59.75 | 5 | Cancelled | | | | |
| Lee Chae-un | Halfpipe | 43.75 | DNI | 43.75 | 6 | Cancelled | | | | |
| Lee Chae-un | Slopestyle | 84.00 | 89.50 | 89.50 | 2 Q | 81.25 | DNI | 90.00 | 90.00 | 1st place, gold medalist(s) |
| Kang Dong-hun | Slopestyle | 60.50 | DNI | 60.50 | 5 Q | 31.00 | 57.50 | 74.00 | 74.00 | 3rd place, bronze medalist(s) |
| Lee Dong-heon | Slopestyle | Did not start | | | | Did not advance | | | | |

Women

| Athlete | Event | Qualification | | | | Final | | | | |
| Athlete | Event | Run 1 | Run 2 | Best | Rank | Run 1 | Run 2 | Run 3 | Best | Rank |
|---|---|---|---|---|---|---|---|---|---|---|
| Yu Seung-eun | Big air | —N/a | | | | 70.75 | 48.50 | DNS | 119.25 | 4 |
| Choi Seo-woo | Big air | —N/a | | | | 31.00 | 40.00 | 45.25 | 85.25 | 5 |
| Lee Na-yoon | Halfpipe | 62.25 | DNI | 62.25 | 7 | Cancelled | | | | |
| Choi Seo-woo | Halfpipe | 43.00 | 45.25 | 45.25 | 8 | Cancelled | | | | |
| Heo Young-hyun | Halfpipe | 38.25 | DNI | 38.25 | 9 | Cancelled | | | | |
| Yu Seung-eun | Slopestyle | —N/a | | | | 31.00 | DNI | 58.25 | 58.25 | 5 |
| Choi Seo-woo | Slopestyle | —N/a | | | | 20.25 | DNI | DNI | 20.25 | 7 |

== Speed skating ==
Men

| Athlete | Event | Time | Rank |
|---|---|---|---|
| Kim Jun-ho | 100 m | 9.62 | 3rd place, bronze medalist(s) |
| Kim Tae-yun | 100 m | 9.81 | 9 |
| Cho Sang-hyeok | 100 m | 9.84 | 11 |
| Koo Kyung-min | 100 m | 9.95 | 13 |
| Kim Jun-ho | 500 m | 35.03 | 3rd place, bronze medalist(s) |
| Kim Tae-yun | 500 m | 35.22 | 8 |
| Cho Sang-hyeok | 500 m | 35.26 | 10 |
| Koo Kyung-min | 500 m | Disqualified | |
| Cha Min-kyu | 1000 m | 1:09.63 | 2nd place, silver medalist(s) |
| Koo Kyung-min | 1000 m | 1:10.13 | 6 |
| Cho Sang-hyeok | 1000 m | 1:10.36 | 7 |
| Oh Hyun-min | 1000 m | 1:10.69 | 8 |
| Chung Jae-won | 1500 m | 1:48.58 | 4 |
| Oh Hyun-min | 1500 m | 1:49.26 | 6 |
| Yang Ho-jun | 1500 m | 1:51.37 | 13 |
| Lee Seung-hoon | 5000 m | 6:32.43 | 4 |
| Chung Jae-won | 5000 m | 6:39.48 | 5 |
| Park Sang-eon | 5000 m | 6:50.85 | 11 |
| Chung Jae-won; Park Sang-eon; Lee Seung-hoon | Team pursuit | 3:47.99 | 2nd place, silver medalist(s) |
| Kim Jun-ho; Cha Min-kyu; Cho Sang-hyeok | Team sprint | 1:20.48 | 2nd place, silver medalist(s) |

Women

| Athlete | Event | Time | Rank |
|---|---|---|---|
| Lee Na-hyun | 100 m | 10.50(1) | 1st place, gold medalist(s) |
| Kim Min-sun | 100 m | 10.50(5) | 2nd place, silver medalist(s) |
| Kim Min-ji | 100 m | 10.72 | 7 |
| Park Chae-eun | 100 m | 10.79 | 9 |
| Kim Min-sun | 500 m | 38.24 | 1st place, gold medalist(s) |
| Lee Na-hyun | 500 m | 38.33 | 2nd place, silver medalist(s) |
| Kim Eun-seo | 500 m | 39.56 | 12 |
| Park Chae-eun | 500 m | 39.58 | 13 |
| Lee Na-hyun | 1000 m | 1:16.39 | 3rd place, bronze medalist(s) |
| Kim Min-sun | 1000 m | 1:16.74 | 4 |
| Kang Soo-min | 1000 m | 1:17.90 | 6 |
| Kim Kyoung-ju | 1000 m | 1:19.93 | 15 |
| Park Ji-woo | 1500 m | 2:00.53 | 5 |
| Kang Soo-min | 1500 m | 2:00.96 | 7 |
| Kim Yoon-ji | 1500 m | 2:01.91 | 12 |
| Kim Kyoung-ju | 1500 m | 2:06.45 | 15 |
| Park Ji-woo | 3000 m | 4:16.82 | 5 |
| Kang Soo-min | 3000 m | 4:20.50 | 7 |
| Jeong Yu-na | 3000 m | 4:27.68 | 11 |
| Park Ji-woo; Jeong Yu-na; Kim Yoon-ji | Team pursuit | 3:10.47 | 3rd place, bronze medalist(s) |
| Kim Min-ji; Lee Na-hyun; Kim Min-sun | Team sprint | 1:28.62 | 1st place, gold medalist(s) |
