= Biathlon at the 2025 Asian Winter Games – Women's relay =

Women's 4 × 6 kilometre relay at the 2025 Asian Winter Games
- Venue: Yabuli Ski Resort
- Dates: 13 February 2025
- Competitors: 20 from 5 nations

Medalists
gold medal	China; Tang Jialin, Wen Ying, Chu Yuanmeng, Meng Fanqi
silver medal	South Korea; Ko Eun-jung, Ekaterina Avvakumova, Mariya Abe, Jung Ju-mi
bronze medal	Kazakhstan; Olga Poltoranina, Darya Klimina, Arina Kryukova, Yelizaveta Beletskaya

The women's 4×6 kilometre relay at the 2025 Asian Winter Games was held on 13 February 2025 at Yabuli Ski Resort in Harbin, China.

== Schedule ==
All times are China Standard Time (UTC+08:00)

Date	Time	Event
Thursday, 13 February 2025	10:00	Final

== Results ==
Rank	Team	Penalties			Time
Rank	Team	P	S	Total	Time
1st place, gold medalist(s)	China (CHN)	1+4	2+7	3+11	1:29:06.3
	Tang Jialin	0+0	2+3	2+3	22:01.2
	Wen Ying	1+3	0+0	1+3	22:22.7
	Chu Yuanmeng	0+1	0+3	0+4	23:11.5
	Meng Fanqi	0+0	0+1	0+1	21:30.9
2nd place, silver medalist(s)	South Korea (KOR)	0+7	1+10	1+17	1:29:27.3
	Ko Eun-jung	0+1	0+2	0+3	21:10.9
	Ekaterina Avvakumova	0+2	0+3	0+5	21:39.4
	Mariya Abe	0+2	1+3	1+5	24:16.2
	Jung Ju-mi	0+2	0+2	0+4	22:10.8
3rd place, bronze medalist(s)	Kazakhstan (KAZ)	2+7	1+6	3+13	1:30:01.9
	Olga Poltoranina	0+1	0+1	0+2	21:31.9
	Darya Klimina	0+3	0+1	0+4	21:20.9
	Arina Kryukova	2+3	0+1	2+4	24:25.5
	Yelizaveta Beletskaya	0+0	1+3	1+3	22:43.6
4	Japan (JPN)	3+11	0+8	3+19	1:35:06.8
	Aoi Sato	1+3	0+1	1+4	21:42.7
	Mikoto Takeuchi	1+3	0+1	1+4	25:11.3
	Hikaru Fukuda	0+2	0+3	0+5	24:44.2
	Misa Sasaki	1+3	0+3	1+6	23:28.6
5	Mongolia (MGL)	6+11	2+9	8+20	1:48:16.0
	Mönkhbatyn Doljinsüren	0+2	0+3	0+5	22:55.4
	Davaadulamyn Enkhchimeg	2+3	0+2	2+5	28:26.0
	Khürleegiin Sumiyaa	1+3	2+3	3+6	28:44.4
	Khash-Erdeniin Erdenetungalag	3+3	0+1	3+4	28:10.2
