= List of Indian records in speed skating =

The following are the national records in speed skating in India maintained by the Ice Skating Association of India (ISAI).

== Men ==
Event	Record	Athlete	Date	Meet	Place	Ref
500 meters	36.46	Stephen Paul Kilari	11 March 2017	Champions Challenge	Salt Lake City, United States	
500 meters × 2						
1000 meters	1:11.92	Stephen Paul Kilari	19 March 2016	Olympic Oval Final	Calgary, Canada	
1500 meters	1:54.64	Chandra Mouli Danda	31 October 2026	Nagano Oktoberfest Classic	Calgary, Canada	
3000 meters	4:09.20	Chandra Mouli Danda	20 March 2025	Olympic Oval Final	Calgary, Canada	
5000 meters	7:17.01	Chandra Mouli Danda	16 March 2024	Olympic Oval Final	Calgary, Canada	
10000 meters	15:13.14	Vishwaraj Jadeja	25 March 2014	STW Grote Meerkamp	Heerenveen, Netherlands	
Team pursuit (8 laps)	4:29.32	Chandra Mouli Danda; Vishwaraj Jadeja; Amitesh Mishra	11 February 2025	Asian Winter Games	Harbin, China	
Sprint combination						
Small combination						
Big combination						

== Women ==
Event	Record	Athlete	Date	Meet	Place	Ref
500 meters	41.97	Shruti Kotwal	10 March 2023	AmCup Final	Salt Lake City, United States	
500 meters × 2						
1000 meters	1:25.00	Shruti Kotwal	23 October 2021	AmCup #1	Salt Lake City, United States	
1500 meters	2:17.04	Shruti Kotwal	22 October 2021	AmCup #1	Salt Lake City, United States	
3000 meters	5:30.64	Shruti Kotwal	16 September 2017	Time Trials	Calgary, Canada	
5000 meters						
10000 meters						
Team pursuit (6 laps)						
Sprint combination						
Mini combination						
Small combination						
