= Chinese Taipei at the 2025 Asian Winter Games =

- Flag of Chinese Taipei
- IOC code: TPE
- NOC: Chinese Taipei Olympic Committee

in Harbin, China 7 February 2025 – 14 February 2025
- Competitors: 67 in 8 sports
- Flag bearers (opening): Lin Chun-chieh & Lin Yang-chi
- Flag bearer (closing): Hsu Tzu-ting
- Medals Ranked =8th: Gold 0 Silver 0 Bronze 1 Total 1

Asian Winter Games appearances
- 1990; 1996; 1999; 2003; 2007; 2011; 2017; 2025; 2029

Chinese Taipei competed at the 2025 Asian Winter Games in Harbin, China, from February 7 to 14.

The Chinese Taipei team is scheduled to consist of 67 athletes. The 67 athletes represented the largest team the NOC has sent to the Asian Winter Games. Short track speed skater Lin Chun-chieh and ice hockey player Lin Yang-chi were the country's opening ceremony flagbearers. Meanwhile, hockey player Hsu Tzu-ting was the country's closing ceremony flagbearer.

On February 8, Chinese Taipei won its first ever Asian Winter Games medal, when Chen Ying-chu won the bronze medal in the women's speed skating 100 metres event.

== Medalists ==
The following Taiwanese competitors won medals at the games. In the by discipline sections below, medalists' names are bolded.

Medal	Name	Sport	Event	Date
Bronze	Chen Ying-chu	Speed skating	Women's 100 metres	February 8

== Competitors ==
The following table lists the Chinese Taipei delegation per sport and gender.

Sport	Men	Women	Total
Alpine skiing	2	1	3
Biathlon	1	0	1
Cross-country skiing	5	0	5
Curling	5	5	10
Figure skating	1	0	1
Ice hockey	20	20	40
Short-track speed skating	4	2	6
Speed skating	1	1	2
Total	38	29	67

- One athlete in biathlon will also compete in cross-country skiing.

== Alpine skiing ==
Chinese Taipei entered three alpine skiers (two men and one woman).

Athlete	Event	Run 1		Run 2		Total	
Athlete	Event	Time	Rank	Time	Rank	Time	Rank
Ho Ping-jui	Men's slalom	53.24	21	50.48	15	1:43.72	16
Tsai Yueh-sheng	Men's slalom	53.23	20	DSQ			
Lee Wen-yi	Women's slalom	55.18	12	53.48	12	1:48.66	11

== Biathlon ==
Chinese Taipei entered one male biathlete.

Men

Athlete	Event	Time	Misses	Rank
Fan Ruei-Hong	Sprint	43:51.6	3+0	26

== Cross-country skiing ==
Chinese Taipei entered five male cross-country skiers.

Distance
Men

Athlete	Event	Final	
Athlete	Event	Time	Rank
Lee Chieh-Han	10 km freestyle	27:00.5	32
Liu Hao-Che	10 km freestyle	29:58.5	40
Liu Hao-En	10 km freestyle	28:57.2	38
Joseph James Peng	10 km freestyle	30:56.9	42
Lee Chieh-Han; Liu Hao-Che; Liu Hao-En; Joseph James Peng	4 × 7.5 km relay	1:33:38.6	9

Sprint
Men

Athlete	Event	Qualification		Quarterfinals		Semifinals		Final	
Athlete	Event	Time	Rank	Time	Rank	Time	Rank	Time	Rank
Liu Hao-Che	Sprint classical	4:28.33	37	Did not advance					
Liu Hao-En	Sprint classical	4:12.08	34	Did not advance					
Joseph James Peng	Sprint classical	4:03.40	31	Did not advance					
Fan Ruei-Hong	Sprint classical	4:36.13	38	Did not advance					

== Curling ==
Chinese Taipei entered ten curlers (five per gender).

Summary

Team	Event	Group stage									Qualification	Semifinal	Final / BM	
Team	Event	Opposition Score	Opposition Score	Opposition Score	Opposition Score	Opposition Score	Opposition Score	Opposition Score	Opposition Score	Rank	Opposition Score	Opposition Score	Opposition Score	Rank
Chang Che-lun; Hou Yi-ler; Lin Chen-han; Lin Ting-li; Liu Bor-kai	Men's team	Kazakhstan; **L** 5–10	South Korea; **L** 1–10	Kyrgyzstan; **W** 7–4	Philippines; **L** 3–11	—N/a				4	Did not advance			7
Chang Chia-chi; Lee Yi-chun; Liu I-ling; Yang Ko	Women's team	South Korea; **L** 0–11	China; **L** 2–14	Kazakhstan; **L** 0–14	Thailand; **W** 10–2	Qatar; **W** 9–5	Hong Kong; **L** 1–8	Japan; **L** 5–12	Philippines; **L** 2–9	7	Did not advance			7
Liu Bor-kai; Chou Yi-hsuan	Mixed doubles	Hong Kong; **L** 8–9	Kuwait; **W** 13–3	Mongolia; **W** 8–4	Japan; **L** 3–9	Thailand; **W** 12–0	—N/a			3 **Q**	Philippines; **L** 2–7	Did not advance		6

=== Men's tournament ===
Chinese Taipei entered a men's team.

Round robin

Pos	Team	Skip	Pld	W	L	W–L	PF	PA	DSC	Qualification
1	South Korea	Lee Jae-beom	4	**4**	0	—	43	5	83.43	Semifinals
2	Philippines	Marc Pfister	4	**3**	1	—	28	12	78.11	Qualification
3	Kazakhstan	Abylaikhan Zhuzbay	4	**2**	2	—	19	24	73.49	Qualification
4	Chinese Taipei	Lin Ting-li	4	**1**	3	—	16	35	108.93	
5	Kyrgyzstan	Aibek Asanaliev	4	**0**	4	—	10	40	77.01	

Source: Official website

Draw 1

Sunday, 9 February, 13:00

**Sheet E**	**1**	**2**	**3**	**4**	**5**	**6**	**7**	**8**	**Final**
Chinese Taipei	0	4	0	0	0	0	1	X	**5**
**Kazakhstan 🔨**	3	0	3	1	1	2	0	X	**10**

Draw 4

Monday, 10 February, 14:00

**Sheet B**	**1**	**2**	**3**	**4**	**5**	**6**	**7**	**8**	**Final**
**South Korea 🔨**	5	0	2	1	1	1	X	X	**10**
Chinese Taipei	0	1	0	0	0	0	X	X	**1**

Draw 6

Tuesday, 11 February, 14:00

**Sheet A**	**1**	**2**	**3**	**4**	**5**	**6**	**7**	**8**	**Final**
**Chinese Taipei**	1	0	2	0	2	2	0	X	**7**
Kyrgyzstan 🔨	0	2	0	1	0	0	1	X	**4**

Draw 8

Wednesday, 12 February, 14:00

**Sheet C**	**1**	**2**	**3**	**4**	**5**	**6**	**7**	**8**	**Final**
**Philippines 🔨**	4	2	0	3	0	2	X	X	**11**
Chinese Taipei	0	0	1	0	2	0	X	X	**3**

=== Women's tournament ===
Chinese Taipei entered a women's team.

Round robin

Pos	Team	Skip	Pld	W	L	W–L	PF	PA	DSC	Qualification
1	South Korea	Gim Eun-ji	8	8	0	—	63	14	45.90	Semifinals
2	China	Wang Rui	8	7	1	—	85	21	38.69	Semifinals
3	Japan	Yuina Miura	8	6	2	—	68	30	58.25	Semifinals
4	Kazakhstan	Angelina Ebauyer	8	5	3	—	55	39	54.81	Semifinals
5	Philippines	Kathleen Dubberstein	8	4	4	—	61	36	85.56	
6	Hong Kong	Hung Ling Yue	8	3	5	—	44	45	115.69	
7	Chinese Taipei	Yang Ko	8	2	6	—	29	75	107.27	
8	Thailand	Phichayathida Jaosap	8	1	7	—	19	91	128.48	
9	Qatar	Amna Al-Qaet	8	0	8	—	11	84	180.65	

Source: Official website

Draw 1

Sunday, 9 February, 9:00

**Sheet A**	**1**	**2**	**3**	**4**	**5**	**6**	**7**	**8**	**Final**
Chinese Taipei	0	0	0	0	0	0	X	X	**0**
**South Korea 🔨**	2	2	2	3	1	1	X	X	**11**

Draw 2

Sunday, 9 February, 17:00

**Sheet D**	**1**	**2**	**3**	**4**	**5**	**6**	**7**	**8**	**Final**
**China 🔨**	8	0	2	3	0	1	X	X	**14**
Chinese Taipei	0	1	0	0	1	0	X	X	**2**

Draw 3

Monday, 10 February, 9:00

**Sheet C**	**1**	**2**	**3**	**4**	**5**	**6**	**7**	**8**	**Final**
Chinese Taipei 🔨	0	0	0	0	0	0	X	X	**0**
**Kazakhstan**	3	0	1	4	1	5	X	X	**14**

Draw 4

Monday, 10 February, 19:00

**Sheet B**	**1**	**2**	**3**	**4**	**5**	**6**	**7**	**8**	**Final**
**Chinese Taipei 🔨**	3	0	2	0	1	1	3	X	**10**
Thailand	0	1	0	1	0	0	0	X	**2**

Draw 5

Tuesday, 11 February, 9:00

**Sheet E**	**1**	**2**	**3**	**4**	**5**	**6**	**7**	**8**	**Final**
Qatar	0	0	0	1	4	0	X	X	**5**
**Chinese Taipei 🔨**	3	4	1	0	0	1	X	X	**9**

Draw 7

Wednesday, 12 February, 9:00

**Sheet C**	**1**	**2**	**3**	**4**	**5**	**6**	**7**	**8**	**Final**
**Hong Kong 🔨**	1	1	2	2	1	0	1	X	**8**
Chinese Taipei	0	0	0	0	0	1	0	X	**1**

Draw 8

Wednesday, 12 February, 19:00

**Sheet B**	**1**	**2**	**3**	**4**	**5**	**6**	**7**	**8**	**Final**
**Japan**	5	1	0	2	0	0	4	X	**12**
Chinese Taipei 🔨	0	0	1	0	4	0	0	X	**5**

Draw 9

Thursday, 13 February, 9:00

**Sheet D**	**1**	**2**	**3**	**4**	**5**	**6**	**7**	**8**	**Final**
Chinese Taipei	0	0	1	0	1	0	0	X	**2**
**Philippines 🔨**	2	2	0	3	0	1	1	X	**9**

=== Mixed doubles tournament ===
Chinese Taipei entered a mixed doubles pair.

Round robin

Pos	Team	Athletes	Pld	W	L	W–L	PF	PA	DSC	Qualification
1	Japan	Koana / Aoki	5	5	0	—	49	8	57.23	Semifinals
2	Hong Kong	Hung / Yan	5	4	1	—	46	26	56.68	Qualification
3	Chinese Taipei	Chou / Liu	5	3	2	—	44	25	65.56	Qualification
4	Thailand	Sonkham / Jearateerawit	5	2	3	—	29	46	142.12	
5	Kuwait	Abdulateef / Al-Kandari	5	1	4	—	14	41	197.23	
6	Mongolia	Enkhzayaa / Bayar	5	0	5	—	16	52	134.74	

Source: Official website

Draw 2

Tuesday, 4 February, 14:00

**Sheet C**	**1**	**2**	**3**	**4**	**5**	**6**	**7**	**8**	**Final**
**Hong Kong 🔨**	3	0	2	0	3	1	0	0	**9**
Chinese Taipei	0	4	0	1	0	0	2	1	**8**

Draw 3

Wednesday, 5 February, 10:00

**Sheet E**	**1**	**2**	**3**	**4**	**5**	**6**	**7**	**8**	**Final**
**Chinese Taipei 🔨**	2	0	5	2	0	0	4	X	**13**
Kuwait	0	1	0	0	1	1	0	X	**3**

Draw 4

Wednesday, 5 February, 14:00

**Sheet B**	**1**	**2**	**3**	**4**	**5**	**6**	**7**	**8**	**Final**
Mongolia	2	0	0	0	1	0	1	X	**4**
**Chinese Taipei 🔨**	0	4	2	1	0	1	0	X	**8**

Draw 6

Thursday, 6 February, 10:00

**Sheet A**	**1**	**2**	**3**	**4**	**5**	**6**	**7**	**8**	**Final**
Chinese Taipei 🔨	1	0	0	0	0	2	X	X	**3**
**Japan**	0	2	2	2	3	0	X	X	**9**

Draw 8

Thursday, 6 February, 18:00

**Sheet D**	**1**	**2**	**3**	**4**	**5**	**6**	**7**	**8**	**Final**
**Chinese Taipei 🔨**	1	2	4	2	1	2	X	X	**12**
Thailand	0	0	0	0	0	0	X	X	**0**

Qualification

Friday, 7 February, 9:00

**Sheet C**	**1**	**2**	**3**	**4**	**5**	**6**	**7**	**8**	**Final**
**Philippines 🔨**	0	1	0	1	2	1	2	X	**7**
Chinese Taipei	1	0	1	0	0	0	0	X	**2**

== Figure skating ==
Chinese Taipei entered one male figure skater.

Athlete(s)	Event	SP		FP		Total	
Athlete(s)	Event	Points	Rank	Points	Rank	Points	Rank
Li Yu-Hsiang	Men's	57.38	11	129.88	8	187.26	8

== Ice hockey ==
=== Men's tournament ===
Chinese Taipei qualified a men's hockey team. The Chinese Taipei team qualified after being ranked as one of the top 12 teams in Asia on the IIHF World Ranking as of May 2024.

Chinese Taipei was represented by the following 20 athletes:

- Chang Han-yuan (D)
- Chen Chiung-yuan (F)
- Chen Kuan-ting (F)
- Chen Tai-yu (G)
- Lee Yi-cheng (G)
- Li Zheng-wei (D)
- Lin Ching (D)
- Lin Hung-ju (F)
- Lin Jui-yu (F)
- Lin Yi-kuan (F)
- Lin Yo-chen (F)
- Pan Yi-cheng (D)
- Peng Mo (D)
- Sang Chuo-en (D)
- Shih Chen-yun (F)
- Wang Po-hsiang (F)
- Wang Yung-hsuan (D)
- Wen Pei-an (F)
- Yang Chang-hsing (F)
- Yu Sung-yin (F)

Legend: G = Goalie, D = Defense, F = Forward

Group stage

Pos	Team	Pld	W	OW	OL	L	GF	GA	GD	Pts	Qualification
1	Kazakhstan	5	5	0	0	0	41	3	+38	15	Quarterfinals
2	South Korea	5	3	1	0	1	36	10	+26	11	Quarterfinals
3	Japan	5	3	0	0	2	28	11	+17	9	Quarterfinals
4	China	5	2	0	1	2	20	14	+6	7	Quarterfinals
5	Chinese Taipei	5	1	0	0	4	4	52	−48	3	Quarterfinals
6	Thailand	5	0	0	0	5	2	41	−39	0	Quarterfinals

Source: OCA

4 February; 12:00	Chinese Taipei	**0–15** (0–4, 0–8, 0–3)	**Japan**	Harbin Ice Hockey Arena, Harbin; Attendance: 2,913

Game reference

Lee Yi-cheng
Goalies
Eiki Sato
Referees:
Chae Young-jin (KOR)
Timur Morev (KAZ)

0–1	06:19 – Hitosato (K. Otsu)
0–2	08:12 – Suzuki (Irikura, Y. Otsu)
0–3	19:30 – Yoneyama (K. Otsu, Osawa)
0–4	19:53 – Hitosato
0–5	22:43 – Halliday (Hitosato, K. Otsu)
0–6	24:23 – Isogai (Y. Otsu, Irikura)
0–7	26:59 – Suzuki (Y. Otsu, Irikura)
0–8	27:37 – Isogai (Y. Otsu)
0–9	29:01 – K. Otsu (Yoneyama, Hitosato)
0–10	31:37 – Lawlor (Tsutsumi, Yoneyama)
0–11	31:57 – Furuhashi (Kobayashi)
0–12	37:08 – Yoneyama (Hitosato, Kobayashi) (PP)
0–13	50:59 – Okubo (Hitosato, Kobayashi)
0–14	55:19 – Suzuki (Isogai, Irikura)
0–15	57:26 – Irikura (Suzuki, H. Sato) (PP2)

10 min
Penalties
6 min
13
Shots
61

5 February; 16:00	**South Korea**	**14–1** (4–0, 6–0, 4–1)	Chinese Taipei	Harbin Ice Hockey Arena, Harbin; Attendance: 1,597

Game reference

Ha Jung-ho
Goalies
Lee Yi-cheng
Referees:
Liu Jiaqi (CHN)
Faris Hakimin Yusoff (MAS)

Kong (Kim S.H.) – 05:41	1–0
Kim S.W. (Ahn, Lee C.) – 11:14	2–0
Oh (Kong, Kim G.) – 11:38	3–0
Kim S.Y. (Kong, Kim W.) – 17:19	4–0
Kim S.W. (Lee C., Nam) – 20:09	5–0
Kim S.Y. (Kang M., Kim W.) – 23:20	6–0
Ahn (Kim S.W., Lee M.J.) – 24:40	7–0
Oh (Lee C., Kim S.W.) – 32:28	8–0
Lee C. (Kim S.W., Ahn) – 37:25	9–0
Ahn (Lee C., Kim S.W.) – 37:45	10–0
Nam (Ahn, Kim S.W.) – 40:22	11–0
	11–1	40:58 – Peng (Wen)
Lee C. (Kim S.W., Ahn) – 49:42	12–1
Kim S.W. (Lee C., Kong) – 53:41	13–1
Kwon (Kim S.Y., Oh) – 57:32	14–1

2 min
Penalties
6 min
65
Shots
7

7 February; 9:00	**Kazakhstan**	**17–0** (5–0, 5–0, 7–0)	Chinese Taipei	Harbin Ice Hockey Arena, Harbin; Attendance: 1,748

Game reference

Jelaladdin Amirbekov
Maxim Pavlenko
Goalies
Chen Tai-yu
Lee Yi-cheng
Referees:
Chae Young-jin (KOR)
Wang Gongbo (CHN)

Buyalskiy (Mikhailov, Stepanenko) – 01:44	1–0
Likhotnikov (Panyukov, Savitskiy) – 06:25	2–0
Rymarev (Omirbekov, Starchenko) – 08:44	3–0
Panyukov (Likhotnikov, Savitskiy) – 09:02	4–0
Panyukov (Savitskiy, Likhotnikov) – 11:34	5–0
Omirbekov (Rymarev, Daniyar) – 20:28	6–0
Korolyov (Butenko, Chaporov) – 22:40	7–0
Savitskiy (Panyukov) – 27:57	8–0
Panyukov (Starchenko, Beketayev) (PP) – 32:36	9–0
Omirbekov (Beketayev, Starchenko) – 35:26	10–0
Daniyar (Rymarev, Omirbekov) – 47:44	11–0
Grents (Likhotnikov, Daniyar) (PP) – 49:44	12–0
Ospanov (Chaporov, Borissevich) – 50:58	13–0
Panyukov (Butenko, Likhotnikov) – 53:43	14–0
Ospanov (Borissevich, Chaporov) – 54:05	15–0
Borissevich (Gaitamirov, Likhotnikov) – 56:43	16–0
Chaporov (Borissevich, Breus) – 58:14	17–0

0 min
Penalties
6 min
76
Shots
9

8 February; 20:00	**China**	**5–0** (4–0, 0–0, 1–0)	Chinese Taipei	Harbin Ice Hockey Arena, Harbin; Attendance: 3,101

Game reference

Sun Zehao
Goalies
Chen Tai-yu
Lee Yi-cheng
Referees:
Anton Boryayev (KAZ)
Konstantin Chubenko (KAZ)

Hou (Han) – 00:56	1–0
Yu J. (Yan, Zuo) (PP) – 03:32	2–0
Zhang Z. (SH) – 06:12	3–0
Yan (Han, Zhang Z.) (PP) – 14:14	4–0
Wang (Zhang P., Hou) (PP) – 50:15	5–0

8 min
Penalties
10 min
51
Shots
14

10 February; 16:00	**Chinese Taipei**	**3–1** (0–0, 2–0, 1–1)	Thailand	Harbin Ice Hockey Arena, Harbin; Attendance: 2,089

Game reference

Lee Yi-cheng
Goalies
Dominik Vollenweider
Referees:
Wang Gongbo (CHN)
Faris Hakimin Yusoff (MAS)

Chang (Lin H., Lin J.) – 22:42	1–0
Wen (Lin Y.C., Peng) – 30:09	2–0
Lin Y.C. (SH) – 44:36	3–0
	3–1	53:15 – Aarola (Kindborn, Yannakornthanapunt) (PP)

16 min
Penalties
8 min
41
Shots
36

Quarterfinals

11 February; 20:00	**China**	**7–2** (1–1, 2–0, 4–1)	Chinese Taipei	Harbin Ice Hockey Arena, Harbin; Attendance: 3,211

Game reference

Sun Zehao
Goalies
Lee Yi-cheng
Chen Tai-yu
Referees:
Anton Boryayev (KAZ)
Konstantin Chubenko (KAZ)

	0–1	06:23 – Chen K. (Wang P.)
Zhang Z. (Zhang P., Zuo) (PP) – 09:27	1–1
Yan (Han, Zuo) – 28:32	2–1
Zhang P. (Hou, Wang) (PP) – 35:10	3–1
Chen K. (Zhang Z., Zhang P.) – 41:17	4–1
Hou (Wang, Han) – 42:55	5–1
Yu J. (Hou) – 48:04	6–1
Zhang P. (Hou, Zhang J.) (PP) – 50:01	7–1
	7–2	51:04 – Lin J. (Lin H.)

2 min
Penalties
18 min
65
Shots
16

=== Women's tournament ===
Chinese Taipei qualified a women's hockey team. The Chinese Taipei team qualified after being ranked as one of the top eight teams in Asia on the IIHF World Ranking as of May 2024.

Chinese Taipei was represented by the following 20 athletes:

- Chang en-ni (F)
- Chang en-wei (F)
- Hsieh Chih-chen (F)
- Hsu Ting-yu (F)
- Hsu Tzu-ting (G)
- Hsu Yu-tong (D)
- Huang Min-chuan (D)
- Huang Yun-chu (F)
- Kao Wei-ting (D)
- Lin Chieh-yun (F)
- Lin Yang-chi (D)
- Liu Chih-lin (D)
- Liu Yen-wei (F)
- Sha Yun-yun (D)
- Tan Su-ting (F)
- Tao Sing-lin (F)
- Wang Yun-tzu (G)
- Wu Ji-cih (F)
- Yeh Hui-chen (F)
- Yeh Pei-han (F)

Legend: G = Goalie, D = Defense, F = Forward

Preliminary round

Pos	Team	Pld	W	OW	OL	L	GF	GA	GD	Pts	Qualification
1	Kazakhstan	4	3	1	0	0	27	1	+26	**11**	Final round
2	South Korea	4	3	0	1	0	22	3	+19	**10**	Final round
3	Chinese Taipei	4	2	0	0	2	13	10	+3	**6**	
4	Thailand	4	1	0	0	3	3	25	−22	**3**	
5	Hong Kong	4	0	0	0	4	2	28	−26	**0**	

Source: OCA

3 February; 15:30	Thailand	**1–4** (0–2, 1–1, 0–1)	**Chinese Taipei**	Harbin Sport University Stadium, Harbin; Attendance: 1,133

Game reference

Thamida Kunthadapakorn
Goalies
Hsu Tzu-ting
Referees:
Lee Kyung-sun (KOR)
Wan Mei Wah (MAS)

	0–1	17:16 – Chang E.N. (Hsu Y., Tan) (PP)
	0–2	18:13 – Huang Y. (Hsu Y., Chang E.N.) (PP)
	0–3	34:32 – Wu (Yeh H., Liu C.)
Yannakornthanapunt (Vorawat, Panyamaneerat) – 39:02	1–3
	1–4	59:01 – Huang M. (SH)

8 min
Penalties
8 min
15
Shots
42

6 February; 19:30	**Kazakhstan**	**5–1** (1–1, 4–0, 0–0)	Chinese Taipei	Harbin Sport University Stadium, Harbin; Attendance: 1,129

Game reference

Arina Chshyokolova
Goalies
Hsu Tzu-ting
Wang Yun-tzu
Referees:
Lee Kyung-sun (KOR)
Wan Mei Wah (MAS)

	0–1	04:23 – Wu (Lin C.)
Sviridova – 12:24	1–1
Filimonova (Shegay, Orazbayeva) – 23:20	2–1
Butorina (Zubkova, Voronova) – 24:58	3–1
Aldabergenova (Sviridova, Ashimova) – 29:44	4–1
Filimonova (Orazbayeva, Moldabay) – 31:03	5–1

0 min
Penalties
14 min
50
Shots
16

8 February; 15:30	Chinese Taipei	**2–3** (0–1, 1–0, 1–2)	**South Korea**	Harbin Sport University Stadium, Harbin; Attendance: 1,067

Game reference

Hsu Tzu-ting
Goalies
Kim Yeon-ju
Referees:
Liu Lu (CHN)
Wan Mei Wah (MAS)

	0–1	06:55 – Park Ji-Y. (Lee E. Jr., Kim D.)
Yeh H. (Lin Y.) – 28:04	1–1
	1–2	47:27 – Jung S. (Kang N., Choi)
Huang Y. (Chang E.N., Wu) – 49:33	2–2
	2–3	59:45 – Kim S. (Park J.A., Lee E. Jr.) (PP)

12 min
Penalties
0 min
7
Shots
76

9 February; 19:30	**Chinese Taipei**	**6–1** (2–0, 4–0, 0–1)	Hong Kong	Harbin Sport University Stadium, Harbin; Attendance: 1,048

Game reference

Hsu Tzu-ting
Wang Yun-tzu
Goalies
Mok Hei Lam
Olivia LLoren
Referees:
Lee Kyung-sun (KOR)
Song Meina (CHN)

Chang E.N. (Lin C., Huang Y.) – 09:35	1–0
Kao (Hsieh) – 17:24	2–0
Huang Y. (Liu Y., Lin Y.) – 28:52	3–0
Chang E.W. (Hsieh, Yeh H.) – 30:20	4–0
Chang E.W. (Hsieh) – 33:49	5–0
Yeh H. (Hsieh, Sha) – 37:19	6–0
	6–1	54:20 – C. Wong (Wong K.)

0 min
Penalties
0 min
38
Shots
14

== Short-track speed skating ==
Men

Athlete	Event	Heat		Quarterfinal		Semifinal		Final	
Athlete	Event	Time	Rank	Time	Rank	Time	Rank	Time	Rank
Lai Tsai Huan-chen	500 m	43.870	3 **q**	44.057	5	Did not advance			
Chang Chuan-lin	500 m	42.561	2 **Q**	42.023	4	Did not advance			
Lin Chun-chieh	500 m	43.087	3 **q**	43.504	4	Did not advance			
Chang Chuan-lin	1000 m	1:30.821	2 **Q**	1:28.106	1:28.106	Did not advance			
Lin Chun-chieh	1000 m	1:30.950	3	Did not advance					
Tsai Chia-wei	1000 m	1:30.600	3 **q**	1:29.972	5	Did not advance			
Lai Tsai Huan-chen	1500 m	—N/a		2:24.848	4 **ADV**	2:23.794	4 **FB**	2:33.760	13
Chang Chuan-lin	1500 m	—N/a		2:20.956	3 **Q**	2:27.885	5	Did not advance	
Tsai Chia-wei	1500 m	—N/a		2:27.367	3 **Q**	2:22.258	3 **FA**	2:24.309	7
Tsai Chia-wei; Lin Chun-chieh; Lai Tsai Huan-chen; Chang Chuan-lin	5000 m relay	—N/a				7:31.168	3 **FB**	7:15.589	5

Women

Athlete	Event	Heat		Quarterfinal		Semifinal		Final	
Athlete	Event	Time	Rank	Time	Rank	Time	Rank	Time	Rank
Chang Wan-ting	500 m	48.178	4	Did not advance					
Chung Hsiao-ying	500 m	46.411	3 **Q**	46.280	4	Did not advance			
Chang Wan-ting	1000 m	1:42.917	4	Did not advance					
Chung Hsiao-ying	1000 m	1:38.777	5	Did not advance					
Chang Wan-ting	1500 m	—N/a		2:40.363	4 **q**	2:48.594	3 **FB**	2:46.908	14
Chung Hsiao-ying	1500 m	—N/a		2:40.952	5	Did not advance			

Mixed

Athlete	Event	Quarterfinal		Semifinal		Final	
Athlete	Event	Time	Rank	Time	Rank	Time	Rank
Chung Hsiao-ying; Chang Wan-ting; Lin Chun-chieh; Chang Chuan-lin	2000 m relay	2:51.211	3 **q**	2:51.766	3 **FB**	PEN	

Qualification legend: FA - Qualify to medal final; FB - Qualify to consolation final

== Speed skating ==
Chinese Taipei entered two speed skaters (one per gender).

Athlete	Event	Time	Rank
Tai Wei-lin	Men's 100 m	9.99	14
Tai Wei-lin	Men's 500 m	36.02	14
Tai Wei-lin	Men's 1000 m	1:11.64	13
Tai Wei-lin	Men's 1500 m	1:51.30	12
**Chen Ying-chu**	Women's 100 m	10.51	3rd place, bronze medalist(s)
**Chen Ying-chu**	Women's 500 m	38.88	5
**Chen Ying-chu**	Women's 1000 m	1:19.74	12
