= Speed skating at the 2025 Asian Winter Games – Women's 100 metres =

Women's 100 metres at the 2025 Asian Winter Games
- Venue: Heilongjiang Speed Skating Hall
- Dates: 8 February 2025
- Competitors: 18 from 7 nations

Medalists
gold medal	Lee Na-hyun	South Korea
silver medal	Kim Min-sun	South Korea
bronze medal	Chen Ying-chu	Chinese Taipei

The women's 100 metres competition in speed skating at the 2025 Asian Winter Games was held on 8 February 2025 in Harbin, China.

== Schedule ==
All times are China Standard Time (UTC+08:00)

Date	Time	Event
Saturday, 8 February 2025	12:29	Final

== Records ==
Prior to this competition, the existing world and Games records were as follows.

World Record	—	—	—	—
Games Record	Xing Aihua (CHN)	10.38	Changchun, China	31 January 2007

== Results ==
Rank	Pair	Athlete	Time	Notes
1st place, gold medalist(s)	8	Lee Na-hyun (KOR)	10.501	
2nd place, silver medalist(s)	9	Kim Min-sun (KOR)	10.505	
3rd place, bronze medalist(s)	7	Chen Ying-chu (TPE)	10.51	
4	9	Tian Ruining (CHN)	10.52	
5	5	Wang Jingziqian (CHN)	10.57	
6	6	Yu Shihui (CHN)	10.70	
7	4	Kim Min-ji (KOR)	10.72	
8	8	Kristina Silaeva (KAZ)	10.73	
9	5	Park Chae-eun (KOR)	10.79	
10	7	Kako Yamane (JPN)	10.80	
11	4	Iori Kitahara (JPN)	10.81	
12	6	Xu Meng (CHN)	10.827	
13	3	Inessa Shumekova (KAZ)	10.829	
14	1	Margarita Galiyeva (KAZ)	11.10	
15	2	Darya Vazhenina (KAZ)	11.23	
16	1	Shruti Kotwal (IND)	11.68	
17	3	Nicole Law (HKG)	12.56	
18	2	Diya Harsha Rao (IND)	13.21	
