= Speed skating at the 2025 Asian Winter Games – Women's 500 metres =

Women's 500 metres at the 2025 Asian Winter Games
- Venue: Heilongjiang Speed Skating Hall
- Dates: 9 February 2025
- Competitors: 20 from 7 nations

Medalists
gold medal	Kim Min-sun	South Korea
silver medal	Lee Na-hyun	South Korea
bronze medal	Tian Ruining	China

The women's 500 metres competition in speed skating at the 2025 Asian Winter Games was held on 9 February 2025 in Harbin, China.

== Schedule ==
All times are China Standard Time (UTC+08:00)

Date	Time	Event
Sunday, 9 February 2025	12:00	Final

== Records ==
Prior to this competition, the existing world and Games records were as follows.

World Record	Lee Sang-hwa (KOR)	36.36	Salt Lake City, United States	16 November 2013
Games Record	Nao Kodaira (JPN)	37.39	Sapporo, Japan	21 February 2017

== Results ==
Rank	Pair	Athlete	Time	Notes
1st place, gold medalist(s)	8	Kim Min-sun (KOR)	38.24	
2nd place, silver medalist(s)	9	Lee Na-hyun (KOR)	38.33	
3rd place, bronze medalist(s)	10	Tian Ruining (CHN)	38.57	
4	5	Wang Jingziqian (CHN)	38.87	
5	6	Chen Ying-chu (TPE)	38.88	
6	7	Iori Kitahara (JPN)	38.97	
7	8	Rio Yamada (JPN)	39.00	
8	10	Kristina Silaeva (KAZ)	39.11	
9	3	Xu Meng (CHN)	39.20	
10	7	Yu Shihui (CHN)	39.27	
11	9	Kako Yamane (JPN)	39.35	
12	4	Kim Eun-seo (KOR)	39.56	
13	6	Park Chae-eun (KOR)	39.58	
14	2	Inessa Shumekova (KAZ)	39.676	
15	3	Darya Vazhenina (KAZ)	39.677	
16	5	Anna Kubo (JPN)	39.79	
17	4	Margarita Galiyeva (KAZ)	40.48	
18	2	Shruti Kotwal (IND)	42.86	
19	1	Nicole Law (HKG)	46.87	
20	1	Diya Harsha Rao (IND)	52.94	
