= Biathlon at the 2025 Asian Winter Games – Women's sprint =

Women's 7.5 kilometre sprint at the 2025 Asian Winter Games
- Venue: Yabuli Ski Resort
- Dates: 11 February 2025
- Competitors: 26 from 8 nations

Medalists
gold medal	Ekaterina Avvakumova	South Korea
silver medal	Meng Fanqi	China
bronze medal	Tang Jialin	China

The women's 7.5 kilometre sprint at the 2025 Asian Winter Games was held on 11 February 2025 at Yabuli Ski Resort in Harbin, China.

== Schedule ==
All times are China Standard Time (UTC+08:00)

Date	Time	Event
Tuesday, 11 February 2025	10:00	Final

== Results ==
Rank	Athlete	Penalties			Time
Rank	Athlete	P	S	Total	Time
1st place, gold medalist(s)	Ekaterina Avvakumova (KOR)	1	1	2	22:45.4
2nd place, silver medalist(s)	Meng Fanqi (CHN)	0	1	1	22:47.8
3rd place, bronze medalist(s)	Tang Jialin (CHN)	0	1	1	23:01.0
4	Arina Kryukova (KAZ)	1	0	1	23:06.5
5	Olga Poltoranina (KAZ)	0	0	0	23:17.8
6	Chu Yuanmeng (CHN)	1	0	1	23:18.4
7	Darya Klimina (KAZ)	1	1	2	23:30.7
8	Aoi Sato (JPN)	1	1	2	23:50.3
9	Yang Lianhong (CHN)	0	2	2	24:01.3
10	Mariya Abe (KOR)	0	1	1	24:12.1
11	Ko Eun-jung (KOR)	2	1	3	24:22.0
12	Mikoto Takeuchi (JPN)	1	0	1	24:43.2
13	Polina Yegorova (KAZ)	0	2	2	25:00.9
14	Jung Ju-mi (KOR)	2	3	5	25:21.5
15	Hikaru Fukuda (JPN)	2	1	3	26:05.8
16	Mönkhbatyn Doljinsüren (MGL)	1	3	4	26:46.1
17	Kanaha Iwasa (JPN)	2	2	4	27:09.1
18	Khash-Erdeniin Erdenetungalag (MGL)	1	1	2	28:12.4
19	Khürleegiin Sumiyaa (MGL)	3	0	3	28:48.5
20	Davaadulamyn Enkhchimeg (MGL)	1	3	4	30:20.4
21	Jariyawadee Audomlap (THA)	4	1	5	35:00.7
22	Diana Taalaibekova (KGZ)	2	3	5	37:43.0
23	Antonina Borisenko (KGZ)	3	4	7	40:00.4
24	Glory Al-Fakhry (LBN)	2	4	6	41:56.8
25	Jeanne Tawk (LBN)	3	4	7	43:46.0
26	Madina Saralaeva (KGZ)	3	5	8	45:40.1
