= List of Asian Games records in short-track speed skating =

This is the list of Asian Winter Games records in short-track speed skating, current after the 2025 Asian Winter Games.

== Men ==
Event	Time	Athlete	Nation	Games	Date	Ref
500 metres	40.509	Kim Tae-sung	South Korea	2025 Harbin	8 February 2025	
1000 metres	1:24.097	Seo Yi-ra	South Korea	2017 Sapporo	22 February 2017	
1500 metres	2:11.372	Kim Dong-sung	South Korea	1999 Gangwon	31 January 1999	
3000 metres	4:57.030	Chae Ji-hoon	South Korea	1996 Harbin	6 February 1996	
5000 metre relay	6:44.705	Lee Ho-suk; Noh Jin-kyu; Sung Si-bak; Kim Byeong-jun	South Korea	2011 Astana–Almaty	2 February 2011	

== Women ==
Event	Time	Athlete	Nation	Games	Date	Ref
500 metres	42.885	Choi Min-jeong	South Korea	2025 Harbin	8 February 2025	
1000 metres	1:30.376	Shim Suk-hee	South Korea	2017 Sapporo	22 February 2017	
1500 metres	2:21.707	Choi Eun-kyung	South Korea	2003 Aomori	6 February 2003	
3000 metres	5:04.510	Kim Moon-jung	South Korea	1999 Gangwon	1 February 1999	
3000 metre relay	4:10.515	Shim Suk-hee; Choi Min-jeong; Noh Do-hee; Kim Ji-yoo	South Korea	2017 Sapporo	22 February 2017	

== Mixed ==
Event	Time	Athlete	Nation	Games	Date	Ref
2000 metre relay	2:39.319	Kim Gil-li; Choi Min-jeong; Park Ji-won; Jang Sung-woo	South Korea	2025 Harbin	7 February 2025	
