= North Korea at the 2025 Asian Winter Games =

- Flag of North Korea
- IOC code: PRK
- NOC: North Korean Olympic Committee

in Harbin, China 7 February 2025 – 14 February 2025
- Competitors: 3 in 1 sport
- Flag bearers: Han Kum-chol & Ryom Tae-ok
- Medals Ranked 6th: Gold 0 Silver 1 Bronze 0 Total 1

Asian Winter Games appearances
- 1986; 1990; 1996–1999; 2003; 2007; 2011; 2017; 2025; 2029

North Korea competed at the 2025 Asian Winter Games in Harbin, China, from February 7 to 14. The North Korean team consisted of three figure skaters (two men and one woman). Figure skaters Han Kum-chol and Ryom Tae-ok were the country's opening ceremony flagbearers. The country only sent medal contending athletes.

The North Korean team won one silver medal in the pairs figure skating event, ranking sixth in the overall medal table.

== Medalists ==
| Medal | Name | Sport | Event | Date |
|---|---|---|---|---|
| Silver | Han Kum-chol; Ryom Tae-ok | Figure skating | Pairs | 12 February |

== Competitors ==
The following table lists the North Korean delegation per sport and gender.

| Sport | Men | Women | Total |
|---|---|---|---|
| Figure skating | 2 | 1 | 3 |
| Total | 2 | 1 | 3 |

== Figure skating ==
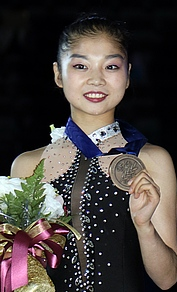
Ryom Tae-ok pictured here in 2018, won the silver medal in the pairs event with Han Kum-chol

North Korea entered a team of three figure skaters (two men and one woman).

| Athlete(s) | Event | SP | | FP | | Total | |
| Athlete(s) | Event | Points | Rank | Points | Rank | Points | Rank |
|---|---|---|---|---|---|---|---|
| Ro Yong-myong | Men's | 68.51 | 6 | 136.65 | 6 | 205.16 | 6 |
| Han Kum-chol / Ryom Tae-ok | Pairs | 56.68 | 3 | 112.20 | 1 | 168.88 | 2nd place, silver medalist(s) |

== See also ==
- North Korea at the 2024 Summer Olympics
