= Short-track speed skating at the 2011 South Asian Winter Games =

Short track speed skating at the 2011 South Asian Winter Games was held at Dehradun RSC Arena in Dehradun, India. The two events were scheduled for 10–12 January 2011. Only three nations competed in the only ice sport on the program, India, Maldives and Bangladesh. India dominated the competition as it won every single medal available to be won.

== Results ==
=== Men ===
Event	Gold	Silver	Bronze
500 metres	Subodh Patil; India	Harshal Gosale; India	Lavish Vaidya; India
1000 metres	Subodh Patil; India	Mushtaq Ahmed; India	Lavish Vaidya; India
1500 metres	Subodh Patil; India	Harshal Gosale; India	Mushtaq Ahmed; India

=== Women ===
Event	Gold	Silver	Bronze
500 metres	Shruti Kotwal; India	Sonam Tsoma; India	Rinchim Dolam; India
1000 metres	Shruti Kotwal; India	Sonam Tsoma; India	Rinchim Dolam; India
