= Freestyle skiing at the 2025 Asian Winter Games – Men's halfpipe =

Men's halfpipe at the 2025 Asian Winter Games
- Venue: Yabuli Ski Resort
- Dates: 8 February 2025
- Competitors: 9 from 4 nations

Medalists
gold medal	Lee Seung-hun	South Korea
silver medal	Sheng Haipeng	China
bronze medal	Moon Hee-sung	South Korea

The men's halfpipe at the 2025 Asian Winter Games was held on 8 February 2025 at Yabuli Ski Resort in Harbin, China.

== Schedule ==
All times are China Standard Time (UTC+08:00)

Date	Time	Event
Saturday, 8 February 2025	10:12	Final

== Results ==
Legend

- DNI — Did not improve
- DNS — Did not start

Rank	Athlete	Run 1	Run 2	Run 3	Best
1st place, gold medalist(s)	Lee Seung-hun (KOR)	96.00	DNI	97.50	97.50
2nd place, silver medalist(s)	Sheng Haipeng (CHN)	90.50	DNI	DNI	90.50
3rd place, bronze medalist(s)	Moon Hee-sung (KOR)	88.50	DNI	DNI	88.50
4	Toma Matsuura (JPN)	50.00	87.25	DNI	87.25
5	Sun Jingbo (CHN)	86.25	DNI	DNI	86.25
6	Su Shuaibing (CHN)	82.25	DNI	DNI	82.25
7	Shin Dong-ho (KOR)	77.25	DNI	DNI	77.25
8	Kashu Sato (JPN)	58.00	68.50	71.00	71.00
—	Salman Al-Kandari (KUW)				DNS
