= Sheng Haipeng =

Chinese freestyle skier (born 2005)

Personal information
- Born: 12 September 2005 (age 21) Jiangsu, China

Sport
- Country: China
- Sport: Freestyle skiing
- Event: Halfpipe
Medal record
Men's freestyle skiing
Representing China
Asian Games
Silver medal – second place	2025 Harbin	Halfpipe

Sheng Haipeng (Chinese: 盛海鵬, born 12 September 2005) is a Chinese freestyle skier specializing in Halfpipe. He won silver at the 2025 Asian Winter Games in the halfpipe event. He competed at the 2026 Milano Cortina Olympics in Livigno.
