= Freestyle skiing at the 2025 Asian Winter Games – Men's big air =

Men's big air at the 2025 Asian Winter Games
- Venue: Yabuli Ski Resort
- Dates: 12 February 2025
- Competitors: 7 from 4 nations

Medalists
gold medal	Rai Kasamura	Japan
silver medal	Yoon Jong-hyun	South Korea
bronze medal	Shin Yeong-seop	South Korea

The men's big air at the 2025 Asian Winter Games was held on 12 February 2025 at Yabuli Ski Resort in Harbin, China.

The event was originally scheduled to take place on 13 February but after discussions at the team leaders' meeting, jury members agreed to hold the event a day early due to weather conditions.

== Schedule ==
All times are China Standard Time (UTC+08:00)

Date	Time	Event
Wednesday, 12 February 2025	10:22	Final

== Results ==
Legend

- DNI — Did not improve
- DNS — Did not start

Rank	Athlete	Run 1	Run 2	Run 3	Total
1st place, gold medalist(s)	Rai Kasamura (JPN)	93.50	90.00	~~DNI~~	183.50
2nd place, silver medalist(s)	Yoon Jong-hyun (KOR)	88.25	81.25	~~DNI~~	169.50
3rd place, bronze medalist(s)	Shin Yeong-seop (KOR)	~~67.50~~	77.25	88.00	165.25
4	Ruka Ito (JPN)	81.75	78.25	~~DNI~~	160.00
5	Lin Hao (CHN)	73.75	~~68.25~~	76.75	150.50
6	Paul Vieuxtemps (THA)	69.25	~~48.25~~	64.50	133.75
7	Lee Seo-jun (KOR)	57.25	~~DNS~~	~~DNS~~	57.25
