= Speed skating at the 2025 Asian Winter Games – Men's 500 metres =

Men's 500 metres at the 2025 Asian Winter Games
- Venue: Heilongjiang Speed Skating Hall
- Dates: 10 February 2025
- Competitors: 24 from 9 nations

Medalists
gold medal	Gao Tingyu	China
silver medal	Wataru Morishige	Japan
bronze medal	Kim Jun-ho	South Korea

The men's 500 metres competition in speed skating at the 2025 Asian Winter Games was held on 10 February 2025 in Harbin, China.

== Schedule ==
All times are China Standard Time (UTC+08:00)

Date	Time	Event
Monday, 10 February 2025	12:00	Final

== Records ==
Prior to this competition, the existing world and Games records were as follows.

World Record	Pavel Kulizhnikov (RUS)	33.61	Salt Lake City, United States	9 March 2019
Games Record	Gao Tingyu (CHN)	34.69	Sapporo, Japan	20 February 2017

== Results ==
Legend

- DSQ — Disqualified

Rank	Pair	Athlete	Time	Notes
1st place, gold medalist(s)	12	Gao Tingyu (CHN)	34.95	
2nd place, silver medalist(s)	11	Wataru Morishige (JPN)	34.97	
3rd place, bronze medalist(s)	11	Kim Jun-ho (KOR)	35.03	
4	12	Yevgeniy Koshkin (KAZ)	35.152	
5	9	Ryota Kojima (JPN)	35.155	
6	8	Katsuhiro Kuratsubo (JPN)	35.19	
7	7	Lian Ziwen (CHN)	35.20	
8	9	Kim Tae-yun (KOR)	35.22	
9	7	Altay Zhardembekuly (KAZ)	35.25	
10	10	Cho Sang-hyeok (KOR)	35.26	
11	8	Du Haonan (CHN)	35.49	
12	6	Xue Zhiwen (CHN)	35.54	
13	10	Yamato Matsui (JPN)	35.73	
14	6	Tai Wei-lin (TPE)	36.02	
15	5	Nikita Vazhenin (KAZ)	36.19	
16	4	Roman Binazarov (KAZ)	36.62	
17	4	Chandra Mouli Danda (IND)	38.97	
18	3	Sidney Chu (HKG)	39.42	
19	1	Srivatsa Srikantha Rao (IND)	40.58	
20	1	Anubhav Gupta (IND)	43.09	
21	3	Bekhbatyn Tögöldör (MGL)	43.16	
22	2	Nopphaket Suansuk (THA)	44.49	
23	2	Omkara Yogaraj (IND)	1:02.06	
—	5	Koo Kyung-min (KOR)	DSQ	
