= Tai Zhien =

Chinese speed skater (born 2006)

Personal information
- Born: 30 September 2006 (age 19) Tumen, Jilin, China

Sport
- Sport: Speed skating
Medal record
Women's speed skating
Representing China
Asian Winter Games
| Bronze medal – third place | 2025 Harbin | 3000 m |

Tai Zhien (Chinese: 太智恩; pinyin: Tài Zhìēn; Korean: 태지은; born 30 September 2006) is a Chinese speed skater who won the bronze medal for speed skating at the 2025 Asian Winter Games – Women's 3000 metres.

== Early life ==
Tai was born on 30 September 2006, in Tumen, a city in the Yanbian Korean Autonomous Prefecture in Jilin, China, and is of Korean ethnicity. Growing up, she developed a strong interest in winter sports from an early age. At the age of ten, she began skating recreationally with her grandmother on frozen ponds, an experience that inspired her lifelong passion for skating. After a short period practicing roller skating, she transitioned to professional speed skating training and later joined the Jilin Provincial Sports School to develop her athletic career.

== Sports career ==
In April 2023, during the 2022–2023 National Youth Speed Skating Championships, Tai, representing Jilin Sports School, won silver in the Girls Group B 1500 metres and bronze in the 1000 metres events. On 7 April 2023, she and her teammates (Mixed Team C) claimed first place in the Girls’ Group B short-distance team pursuit. She was officially recognized as an 'Athlete of the Year' (运动健将) on 8 June 2023. Later that year, on 10 December 2023, she won a bronze medal in the women’s mass start (youth division) at the China Cup Speed Skating Elite League (Fourth Station).

On 24 February 2024, she won a bronze medal in the women’s mass start skating event (youth division) at the 14th National Winter Games in Hulunbuir, China. Three days later, on February 27, 2024, she won gold in the women’s team pursuit (youth group), representing Sichuan, with a time of 3:07.46. On 16 March 2024, while representing Jilin, she won another gold medal in the women’s team pursuit at the 2024 National Speed Skating Championships, clocking 3:09.72. A week later, on 23 March, Tai earned a bronze medal in the women’s mass start at the National Speed Skating Championships, finishing with a time of 8:48.09.

In January 2025, Tai was awarded the title of 'International Athlete' (国际级运动健将). On the same month, she was selected as part of the Chinese National Team for the 2025 Asian Winter Games held in Harbin, China. On 10 February 2025, she won a bronze medal in the women’s 3000 metres even at the games, finishing in 4:12.01. On 20 March 2025, at the 2024–2025 National Speed Skating Championships in Ürümqi, China, Tai finished second in the women’s 3000 metres event.

== Other honors ==
On 2025, she was among the outstanding athletes who were included in the recommended list by the General Administration of Sport of China for undergraduate studies at Beijing Sports University.
