= Speed skating at the 2025 Asian Winter Games – Women's 3000 metres =

Women's 3000 metres at the 2025 Asian Winter Games
- Venue: Heilongjiang Speed Skating Hall
- Dates: 10 February 2025
- Competitors: 12 from 4 nations

Medalists
gold medal	Yang Binyu	China
silver medal	Han Mei	China
bronze medal	Tai Zhien	China

The women's 3000 metres competition in speed skating at the 2025 Asian Winter Games was held on 10 February 2025 in Harbin, China.

== Schedule ==
All times are China Standard Time (UTC+08:00)

Date	Time	Event
Monday, 10 February 2025	13:02	Final

== Records ==
Prior to this competition, the existing world and Games records were as follows.

World Record	Martina Sáblíková (CZE)	3:52.02	Salt Lake City, United States	9 March 2019
Games Record	Miho Takagi (JPN)	4:05.75	Sapporo, Japan	20 February 2017

== Results ==
Rank	Pair	Athlete	Time	Notes
1st place, gold medalist(s)	5	Yang Binyu (CHN)	4:08.54	
2nd place, silver medalist(s)	6	Han Mei (CHN)	4:09.06	
3rd place, bronze medalist(s)	4	Tai Zhien (CHN)	4:12.01	
4	5	Nadezhda Morozova (KAZ)	4:12.70	
5	4	Park Ji-woo (KOR)	4:16.82	
6	2	Kristina Shumekova (KAZ)	4:17.08	
7	3	Kang Soo-min (KOR)	4:20.50	
8	6	Yuka Takahashi (JPN)	4:20.73	
9	1	Yuna Onodera (JPN)	4:21.12	
10	2	Kyoko Nitta (JPN)	4:21.96	
11	1	Jeong Yu-na (KOR)	4:27.68	
12	3	Arina Ilyachshenko (KAZ)	4:40.44	
