= Speed skating at the 2025 Asian Winter Games – Women's team pursuit =

Women's team pursuit at the 2025 Asian Winter Games
- Venue: Heilongjiang Speed Skating Hall
- Dates: 11 February 2025
- Competitors: 12 from 4 nations

Medalists
gold medal	China; Yang Binyu, Ahenaer Adake, Han Mei
silver medal	Japan; Yuka Takahashi, Yuna Onodera, Rin Kosaka
bronze medal	South Korea; Park Ji-woo, Jeong Yu-na, Kim Yoon-ji

The women's team pursuit competition in speed skating at the 2025 Asian Winter Games was held on 11 February 2025 in Harbin, China.

== Schedule ==
All times are China Standard Time (UTC+08:00)

Date	Time	Event
Tuesday, 11 February 2025	14:54	Final

== Records ==
Prior to this competition, the existing world and Games records were as follows.

World Record	Japan	2:50.76	Salt Lake City, United States	14 February 2020
Games Record	Japan	3:00.08	Sapporo, Japan	21 February 2017

== Results ==
Legend

- DSQ — Disqualified

Rank	Pair	Team	Time	Notes
1st place, gold medalist(s)	2	China (CHN); Yang Binyu; Ahenaer Adake; Han Mei	3:02.75	
2nd place, silver medalist(s)	2	Japan (JPN); Yuka Takahashi; Yuna Onodera; Rin Kosaka	3:05.52	
3rd place, bronze medalist(s)	1	South Korea (KOR); Park Ji-woo; Jeong Yu-na; Kim Yoon-ji	3:10.47	
—	1	Kazakhstan (KAZ); Mariya Degen; Nadezhda Morozova; Kristina Shumekova	DSQ	
