= Speed skating at the 2025 Asian Winter Games – Women's team sprint =

Women's team sprint at the 2025 Asian Winter Games
- Venue: Heilongjiang Speed Skating Hall
- Dates: 9 February 2025
- Competitors: 12 from 4 nations

Medalists
gold medal	South Korea; Kim Min-ji, Lee Na-hyun, Kim Min-sun
silver medal	China; Yu Shihui, Tian Ruining, Han Mei
bronze medal	Kazakhstan; Kristina Silaeva, Darya Vazhenina, Nadezhda Morozova

The women's team sprint competition in speed skating at the 2025 Asian Winter Games was held on 9 February 2025 in Harbin, China.

== Schedule ==
All times are China Standard Time (UTC+08:00)

Date	Time	Event
Sunday, 9 February 2025	14:51	Final

== Records ==
Prior to this competition, the existing world and Games records were as follows.

World Record	Netherlands	1:24.02	Salt Lake City, United States	13 February 2020
Games Record	—	—	—	—

== Results ==
Rank	Pair	Team	Time	Notes
1st place, gold medalist(s)	1	South Korea (KOR); Kim Min-ji; Lee Na-hyun; Kim Min-sun	1:28.62	GR
2nd place, silver medalist(s)	1	China (CHN); Yu Shihui; Tian Ruining; Han Mei	1:28.85	
3rd place, bronze medalist(s)	2	Kazakhstan (KAZ); Kristina Silaeva; Darya Vazhenina; Nadezhda Morozova	1:30.12	
4	2	Japan (JPN); Kako Yamane; Rio Yamada; Rin Kosaka	1:32.81	
