= Short-track speed skating at the 2025 Asian Winter Games – Women's 500 metres =

Women's 500 metres at the 2025 Asian Winter Games
- Venue: Heilongjiang Multifunctional Hall
- Dates: 7–8 February 2025
- Competitors: 25 from 11 nations

Medalists
gold medal	Choi Min-jeong	South Korea
silver medal	Kim Gil-li	South Korea
bronze medal	Lee So-yeon	South Korea

The women's 500 metres competition in short-track speed skating at the 2025 Asian Winter Games was held on 7 and 8 February 2025 in Harbin, China.

== Schedule ==
All times are China Standard Time (UTC+08:00)

Date	Time	Event
Friday, 7 February 2025	10:10	Heats
Saturday, 8 February 2025	12:02	Quarterfinals
Saturday, 8 February 2025	12:41	Semifinals
Saturday, 8 February 2025	13:12	Finals

== Results ==
Legend

- ADV — Advanced
- DNS — Did not start
- PEN — Penalty

=== Heats ===
- Qualification: 1–3 + Best 4 → Quarterfinals (Q + q)

==== Heat 1 ====
Rank	Athlete	Time	Notes
1	Zhang Chutong (CHN)	43.759	Q
2	Rina Shimada (JPN)	44.106	Q
3	Zeinep Kumarkan (KAZ)	45.420	Q
4	Punpreeda Prempreecha (THA)	48.488	
5	Suvarnika Radhakrishnan (IND)	1:11.366	

==== Heat 2 ====
Rank	Athlete	Time	Notes
1	Fan Kexin (CHN)	43.744	Q
2	Lee So-yeon (KOR)	43.817	Q
3	Yana Khan (KAZ)	43.929	Q
4	Yuki Ishikawa (JPN)	44.860	q
5	Varsha S. Puranik (IND)	53.888	

==== Heat 3 ====
Rank	Athlete	Time	Notes
1	Choi Min-jeong (KOR)	43.321	Q
2	Lam Ching Yan (HKG)	45.868	Q
3	Alyssa Pok (SGP)	46.728	Q
4	Chang Wan-ting (TPE)	48.178	
5	Ashley Chin (MAS)	53.100	

==== Heat 4 ====
Rank	Athlete	Time	Notes
1	Kim Gil-li (KOR)	44.644	Q
2	Thanutchaya Chatthaisong (THA)	46.295	Q
3	Chung Hsiao-ying (TPE)	46.411	Q
4	Battulgyn Gereltuyaa (MGL)	48.136	
5	Nicole Law (HKG)	49.678	

==== Heat 5 ====
Rank	Athlete	Time	Notes
1	Wang Xinran (CHN)	44.103	Q
2	Malika Yermek (KAZ)	44.286	Q
3	Haruna Nagamori (JPN)	45.103	Q
4	Amelia Chua (SGP)	49.332	
5	Sai Sahana (IND)	51.383	

=== Quarterfinals ===
- Qualification: 1–2 + Two best 3 → Semifinals (Q + q)

==== Heat 1 ====
Rank	Athlete	Time	Notes
1	Choi Min-jeong (KOR)	43.318	Q
2	Malika Yermek (KAZ)	43.966	Q
3	Yuki Ishikawa (JPN)	44.045	q
4	Lam Ching Yan (HKG)	44.458	

==== Heat 2 ====
Rank	Athlete	Time	Notes
1	Fan Kexin (CHN)	44.772	Q
2	Rina Shimada (JPN)	44.873	Q
3	Thanutchaya Chatthaisong (THA)	45.043	
4	Alyssa Pok (SGP)	46.872	

==== Heat 3 ====
Rank	Athlete	Time	Notes
1	Zhang Chutong (CHN)	43.183	Q
2	Lee So-yeon (KOR)	43.288	Q
3	Yana Khan (KAZ)	43.383	q
4	Chung Hsiao-ying (TPE)	46.280	

==== Heat 4 ====
Rank	Athlete	Time	Notes
1	Wang Xinran (CHN)	44.394	Q
2	Kim Gil-li (KOR)	44.498	Q
3	Zeinep Kumarkan (KAZ)	44.577	
4	Haruna Nagamori (JPN)	45.899	

=== Semifinals ===
- Qualification: 1–2 + Best 3 → Final A (QA), Next best five → Final B (QB)

==== Heat 1 ====
Rank	Athlete	Time	Notes
1	Kim Gil-li (KOR)	43.867	QA
2	Rina Shimada (JPN)	43.931	QA
3	Zhang Chutong (CHN)	43.940	QB
4	Wang Xinran (CHN)	1:09.423	ADVA
—	Yana Khan (KAZ)	PEN	

==== Heat 2 ====
Rank	Athlete	Time	Notes
1	Choi Min-jeong (KOR)	42.885	QA
2	Lee So-yeon (KOR)	43.874	QA
3	Malika Yermek (KAZ)	43.994	QB
4	Fan Kexin (CHN)	44.058	QB
5	Yuki Ishikawa (JPN)	44.932	QB

=== Finals ===
==== Final B ====
Rank	Athlete	Time
1	Zhang Chutong (CHN)	44.084
2	Yuki Ishikawa (JPN)	44.875
—	Malika Yermek (KAZ)	PEN
—	Fan Kexin (CHN)	DNS

==== Final A ====
Rank	Athlete	Time
1st place, gold medalist(s)	Choi Min-jeong (KOR)	43.016
2nd place, silver medalist(s)	Kim Gil-li (KOR)	43.105
3rd place, bronze medalist(s)	Lee So-yeon (KOR)	43.203
4	Wang Xinran (CHN)	43.274
5	Rina Shimada (JPN)	44.223
