= Meng Fanqi =

Chinese biathlete (born 1998)

Personal information
- Nationality: China
- Born: 18 September 1998 (age 28) Jilin, China

Sport
- Sport: Biathlon
- Club: Changchun Winter Sports
Medal record
Women's biathlon
Representing China
Asian Games
Silver medal – second place	2025 Harbin	Sprint
Youth Olympic Games
Gold medal – first place	2016 Lillehammer	Single mixed relay
Junior World Championships
Gold medal – first place	2019 Osrblie	12.5 km individual

Meng Fanqi (Chinese: 孟繁棋; pinyin: Mèng Fánqí; born 18 September 1998) is a Chinese biathlete. She competed in the 2022 Winter Olympics.

== Career ==
Meng started biathlon in 2013. Meng won a gold medal in the single relay at the 2016 Winter Youth Olympics. She also won a gold medal at the 2019 Junior World Championships in the individual event. She competed in multiple biathlon events at the 2022 Winter Olympics. She was part of the Chinese team in the mixed relay, placing 15th out of 20 teams. She placed 47th in the individual event, 62nd in the sprint, and 12th with the Chinese team in the women's relay.

== Biathlon results ==
All results are sourced from the International Biathlon Union.

=== Olympic Games ===
0 medals

Event	Individual	Sprint	Pursuit	Mass start	Relay	Mixed relay
(China) 2022 Beijing	47th	62nd	—	—	12th	15th
(Italy) 2026 Milano Cortina	26th	48th	39th	—	—	—

=== World Championships ===
0 medals

Event	Individual	Sprint	Pursuit	Mass start	Relay	Mixed relay	Single mixed relay
(Austria) 2017 Hochfilzen	91st	71st	—	—	—	—	—
(Sweden) 2019 Östersund	41st	64th	—	—	17th	—	—
(Italy) 2020 Rasen-Antholz	—	39th	50th	—	16th	—	—

*During Olympic seasons competitions are only held for those events not included in the Olympic program.
**The single mixed relay was added as an event in 2019.
