= Speed skating at the 2025 Asian Winter Games – Men's team pursuit =

Men's team pursuit at the 2025 Asian Winter Games
- Venue: Heilongjiang Speed Skating Hall
- Dates: 11 February 2025
- Competitors: 15 from 5 nations

Medalists
| gold medal | China; Liu Hanbin, Wu Yu, Hanahati Muhamaiti |
| silver medal | South Korea; Chung Jae-won, Park Sang-eon, Lee Seung-hoon |
| bronze medal | Japan; Motonaga Arito, Taiyo Morino, Kotaro Kasahara |

The men's team pursuit competition in speed skating at the 2025 Asian Winter Games was held on 11 February 2025 in Harbin, China.

== Schedule ==
All times are China Standard Time (UTC+08:00)

| Date | Time | Event |
|---|---|---|
| Tuesday, 11 February 2025 | 14:23 | Final |

== Records ==
Prior to this competition, the existing world and Games records were as follows.

| World Record | United States | 3:33.66 | Salt Lake City, United States | 27 January 2024 |
| Games Record | South Korea | 3:44.32 | Sapporo, Japan | 22 February 2017 |

== Results ==
| Rank | Pair | Team | Time | Notes |
|---|---|---|---|---|
| 1st place, gold medalist(s) | 2 | China (CHN); Liu Hanbin; Wu Yu; Hanahati Muhamaiti | 3:45.94 | |
| 2nd place, silver medalist(s) | 3 | South Korea (KOR); Chung Jae-won; Park Sang-eon; Lee Seung-hoon | 3:47.99 | |
| 3rd place, bronze medalist(s) | 3 | Japan (JPN); Motonaga Arito; Taiyo Morino; Kotaro Kasahara | 3:52.93 | |
| 4 | 2 | Kazakhstan (KAZ); Nuraly Akzhol; Vitaliy Chshigolev; Vadim Yakubovskiy | 3:57.43 | |
| 5 | 1 | India (IND); Chandra Mouli Danda; Vishwaraj Jadeja; Amitesh Mishra | 4:29.32 | |
