= Tian Ruining =

Chinese speed skater (born 1997)

Personal information
- Nationality: Chinese
- Born: 17 January 1997 (age 29) Xinjiang, China
- Height: 1.68 m (5 ft 6 in)
- Weight: 61 kg (134 lb)

Sport
- Sport: Speed skating
Medal record
Women's speed skating
Representing China
Asian Winter Games
Silver medal – second place	2025 Harbin	Team sprint
Bronze medal – third place	2025 Harbin	500 m

Tian Ruining
- Simplified Chinese: 田芮宁
- Traditional Chinese: 田芮寧
Transcriptions
Standard Mandarin
- Hanyu Pinyin: Tián Ruìníng
- IPA: [tʰjɛ̌n ɻwêɪ nǐŋ]

Tian Ruining (Chinese: 田芮宁; pinyin: Tián Ruìníng; Mandarin pronunciation: [tʰjɛ̌n ɻwêɪ nǐŋ]; born 17 January 1997) is a Chinese speed skater. She competed in the 2018 Winter Olympics.
