= Ekaterina Avvakumova =

Russian-South Korean biathlete (born 1990)

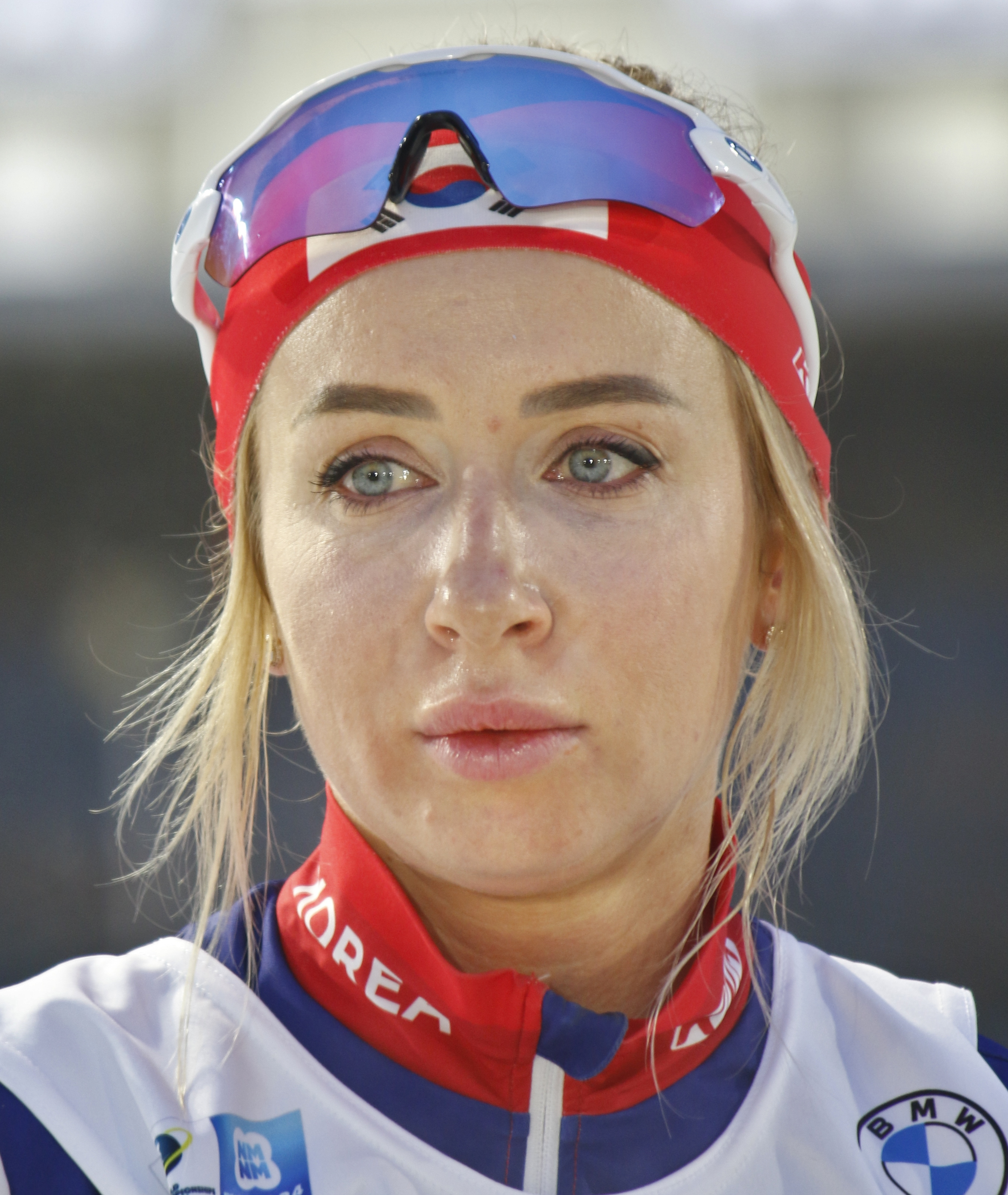
- Avvakumova in 2024

Personal information
- Nationality: Russian; South Korean
- Born: 26 October 1990 (age 36) Veliky Ustyug, Russian SFSR, Soviet Union

Sport
- Sport: Biathlon
Medal record
Women's biathlon
Representing South Korea
Asian Games
| Gold medal – first place | 2025 Harbin | Sprint |

Yekaterina Sergeyevna Avvakumova (Russian: Екатерина Сергеевна Аввакумова, Korean: 예카테리나 세르게예브나 아바쿠모바; born 26 October 1990) is a Russian-born South Korean biathlete. She obtained Korean citizenship in 2017. She competed in the 2018 Winter Olympics and in the 2025 Asian Winter Games. In the 2025 Asian Winter Games she won South Korea’s first gold medal in biathlon at any Asian Winter Games.

== Career results ==
=== Olympic Games ===
0 medals

| Event | Individual | Sprint | Pursuit | Mass start | Relay | Mixed relay |
|---|---|---|---|---|---|---|
| (South Korea) 2018 Pyeongchang | 16th | 87th | — | — | 18th | — |
| (China) 2022 Beijing | 73rd | 49th | LAP | — | — | — |
| (Italy) 2026 Milano Cortina | 63rd | 58th | 55th | — | — | — |

=== World Championships ===
0 medals

| Event | Individual | Sprint | Pursuit | Mass start | Relay | Mixed relay | Single mixed relay |
|---|---|---|---|---|---|---|---|
| (Austria) 2017 Hochfilzen | 5th | 63rd | — | 30th | 18th | 19th | — |
| (Slovenia) 2021 Pokljuka | 28th | 67th | — | — | 23rd | 26th | 23rd |
| (Germany) 2023 Oberhof | 48th | 30th | 53rd | — | — | 21st | 25th |
| (Czech Republic) 2024 Nové Město na Moravě | 31st | 42nd | 44th | — | 19th | 25th | 15th |
