= Malaysia Ice Hockey Federation =

Ice hockey governing body in Malaysia

Malaysia
- Association name: Malaysia Ice Hockey Federation
- IIHF Code: MAS
- IIHF membership: September 28, 2006
- President: YM Tengku Dato Dr Hishammuddin Zaizi bin Almarhum YAM Tengku Bendahara Azman Shah Al-Haj

The Malaysia Ice Hockey Federation (MIHF; Malay: Persekutuan Hoki Ais Malaysia) is the governing body of ice hockey in Malaysia.
