= Lee Na-hyun =

South Korean speed skater (born 2005)

Personal information
- Born: 14 December 2005 (age 20) Seoul, South Korea
- Height: 1.7 m (5 ft 7 in)

Sport
- Sport: Speed skating
- Club: Korean National Sports University
Medal record
Women's speed skating
Representing South Korea
Four Continents Championships
Silver medal – second place	2022 Calgary	Team sprint
Silver medal – second place	2025 Hachinohe	Team sprint
Asian Winter Games
Gold medal – first place	2025 Harbin	100 m
Gold medal – first place	2025 Harbin	Team sprint
Silver medal – second place	2025 Harbin	500 m
Bronze medal – third place	2025 Harbin	1000 m

Lee Na-hyun (Korean: 이나현; born 14 December 2005) is a South Korean speed skater.

== Career ==
Lee competed at the 2025 Asian Winter Games and won a gold medal in the 100 metres with a time of 10.501, and a gold medal in the team sprint. She also won a silver medal in the 500 metres with a time of 38.33 and a bronze medal in the 1000 metres with a time of 1:16.39.

She finished qualification in fourth place in the 500 metres and qualified to represent South Korea at the 2026 Winter Olympics.
