= Chen Ying-chu =

Taiwanese speed skater (born 1995)

Chen Ying-chu (Chinese: 陳映竹; pinyin: Chén Yìngzhú; born 18 February 1995 in Kaohsiung) is a Taiwanese speed skater. In 2025, she became the first athlete representing Chinese Taipei to win a medal at the Asian Winter Games, earning the bronze in the Women's 100 metres. Formerly a competitive roller skater, she also finished 5th in the 500 metres. Later in 2025, she finished second in the 500m at the 2025–26 ISU Speed Skating World Cup – World Cup 2 in Calgary.
