= Shruti Kotwal =

Indian ice speed skater

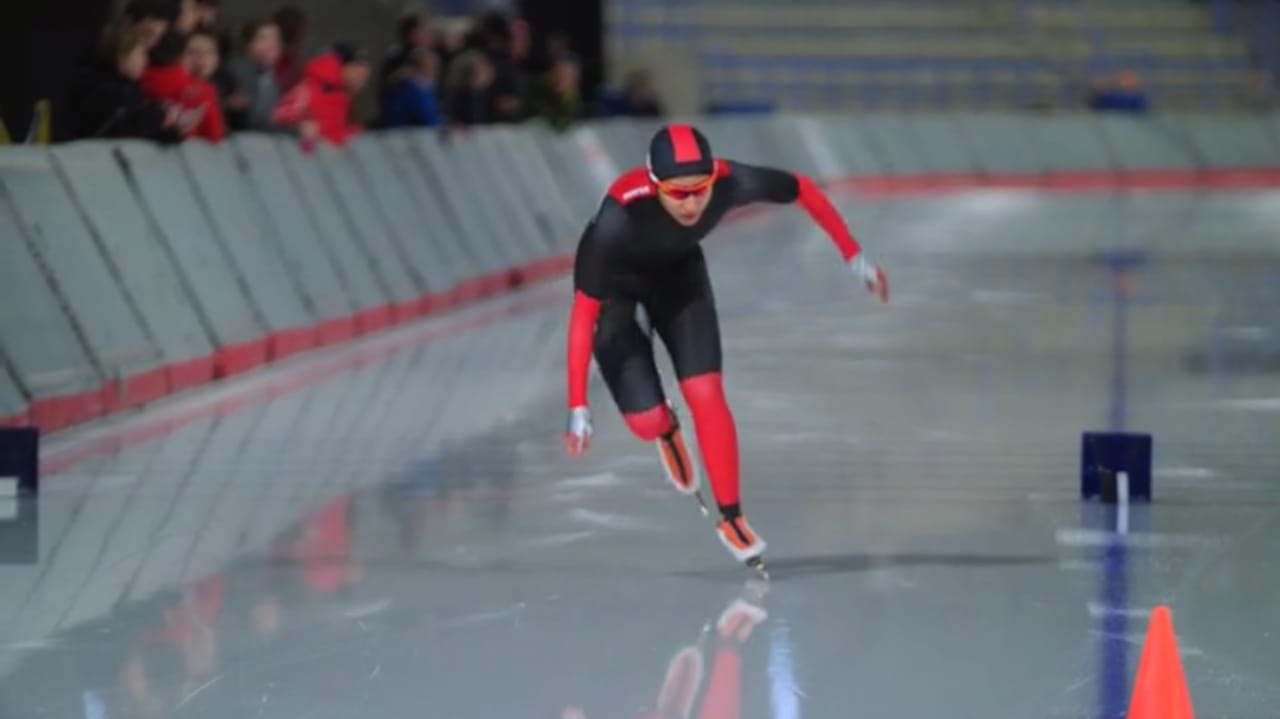

Personal information
- Nationality: Indian
- Born: 2 December 1991 (age 34) Pune, Maharashtra, India
- Education: Fergusson College

Sport
- Country: India
- Sport: Speed skating
Medal record
Women's short track speed skating
Representing India
South Asian Games
Gold medal – first place	2011 Dehradun and Auli	500 m
Gold medal – first place	2011 Dehradun and Auli	1000 m

Shruti Kotwal (born 2 December 1991) is an Indian ice speed skater. She is the country's first professional female ice skater.

== Biography ==
Kotwal was born and brought up in Pune, Maharashtra, India. When she was seven years old she began roller-skating and held national gold medals in the sport before changing to ice-skating.

At the South Asia Championship in 2011 she secured gold medals in the categories of 500m, 1000m and 1500m. The following year, 2012, she received a scholarship from the International Skating Union, which enabled her to travel to Germany for speed skating training under Canadian skater Jeremy Wotherspoon.

In 2017 she represented India at the Asian Winter Games. In 2014 she broke the national record she had previously set herself in the 500 metre speed skating event.

She holds 5 gold medals from the Indian National Ice-Skating Championships and a bronze medal from the National Winter Games.

In 2025, Kotwal represented India at the Asian Winter Games in Harbin, China, marking her second appearance at the event after previously competing in 2017.

Kotwal trains at the Utah Olympic Oval in the United States as part of her preparation for international competitions and qualification for the 2030 Winter Olympics.

Kotwal holds Indian national records in multiple long-track speed skating events, including the 500 metres, 1000 metres and 1500 metres.

Her personal best in the 500 metres is 41.97 seconds, recorded at the AmCup Final in Salt Lake City in 2023.
