= Jung Ju-mi =

South Korean biathlete

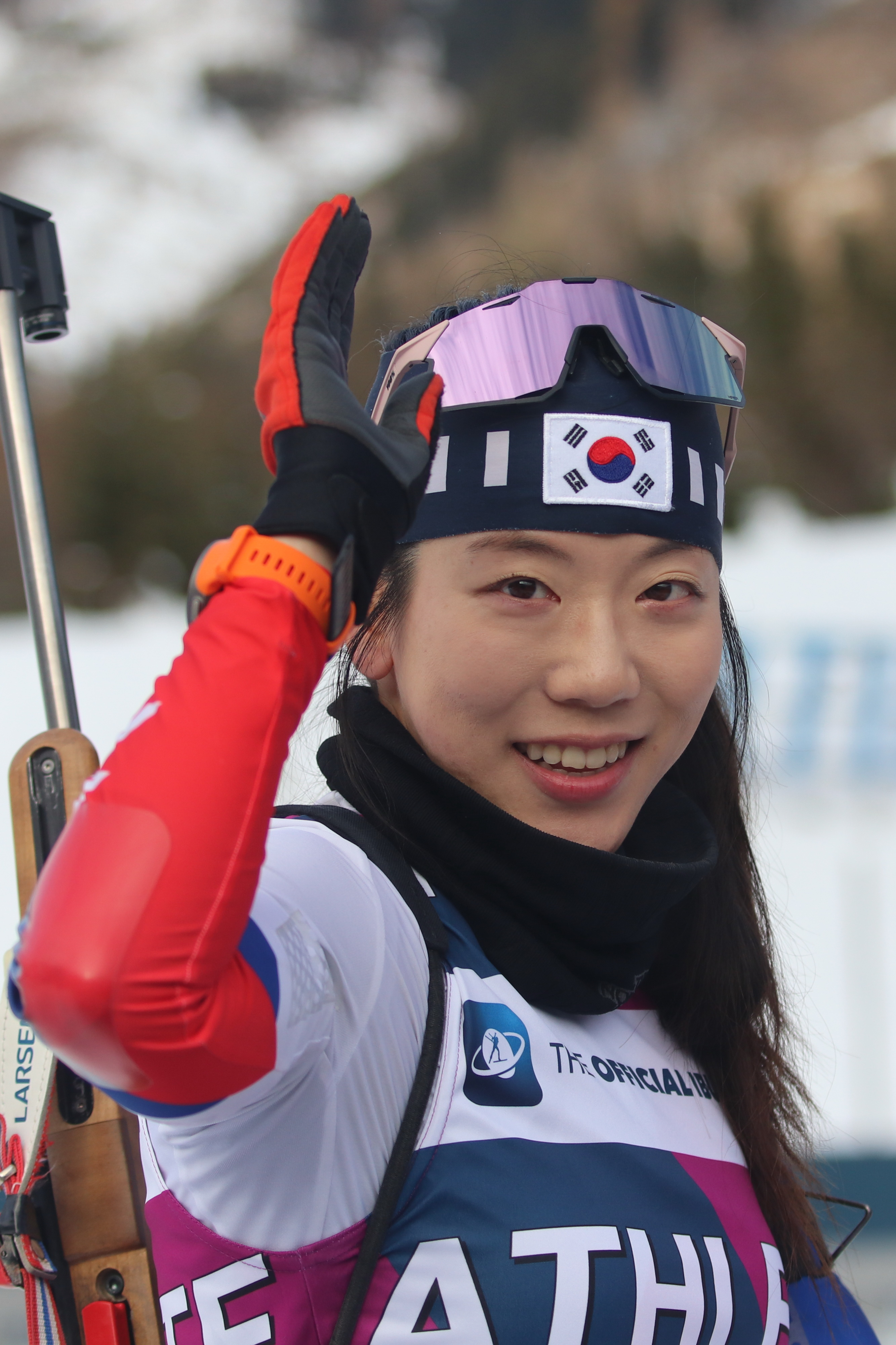

Personal information
- Nationality: South Korean
- Born: 11 September 1997 (age 28)

Sport
- Sport: Biathlon

Jung Ju-mi (born 11 September 1997) is a South Korean biathlete. She competed in the 2018 Winter Olympics.

== Biathlon results ==
All results are sourced from the International Biathlon Union.

=== Olympic Games ===
0 medals

Event	Individual	Sprint	Pursuit	Mass start	Relay	Mixed relay
(South Korea) 2018 Pyeongchang	86th	—	—	—	—	—

=== World Championships ===
0 medals

Event	Individual	Sprint	Pursuit	Mass start	Relay	Mixed relay	Single mixed relay
(Italy) 2020 Rasen-Antholz	96th	—	—	—	22nd	—	—
(Czech Republic) 2024 Nové Město na Moravě	76th	—	—	—	19th	—	—

*During Olympic seasons competitions are only held for those events not included in the Olympic program.
