= China at the 2025 Asian Winter Games =

- Flag of China
- IOC code: CHN
- NOC: Chinese Olympic Committee

in Harbin, China 7 February 2025 – 14 February 2025
- Competitors: 170 in 11 sports
- Flag bearers (opening): Ning Zhongyan & Liu Mengting
- Flag bearer (closing): Xu Mengtao
- Medals Ranked 1st: Gold 32 Silver 27 Bronze 26 Total 85

Asian Winter Games appearances
- 1986; 1990; 1996; 1999; 2003; 2007; 2011; 2017; 2025; 2029

China competed at the 2025 Asian Winter Games in Harbin, China, from February 7 to 14. This marked the third time the country has played host to the Asian Winter Games.

The Chinese team consisted of 170 athletes (85 per gender) competing in all 11 sports. Speed skater and freestyle skier were the country's flagbearers during the opening ceremony.

== Medalists ==
Medal	Name	Sport	Event	Date
Gold	Wang Qiang	Cross-country skiing	Men's sprint classical	8 February
Gold	Li Lei	Cross-country skiing	Women's sprint classical	8 February
Gold	Li Fanghui	Freestyle skiing	Women's halfpipe	8 February
Gold	Lin Xiaojun	Short-track speed skating	Men's 500 metres	8 February
Gold	Zhang Xiaonan	Snowboarding	Women's slopestyle	8 February
Gold	Gao Tingyu	Speed skating	Men's 100 metres	8 February
Gold	Ning Zhongyan	Speed skating	Men's 1500 metres	8 February
Gold	Han Mei	Speed skating	Women's 1500 metres	8 February
Gold	Bayani Jialin	Cross-country skiing	Women's 5 kilometre freestyle	9 February
Gold	Li Xinpeng	Freestyle skiing	Men's aerials	9 February
Gold	Xu Mengtao	Freestyle skiing	Women's aerials	9 February
Gold	Fan Kexin; Gong Li; Zhang Chutong; Wang Xinran; Zang Yize^{[a]} Yang Jingru^{[a]}	Short-track speed skating	Women's 3000 metre relay	9 February
Gold	Bu Luer	Ski mountaineering	Men's sprint	9 February
Gold	Cidan Yuzhen	Ski mountaineering	Women's sprint	9 February
Gold	Wu Yu	Speed skating	Men's 5000 metres	9 February
Gold	Xu Mengtao; Li Xinpeng; Qi Guangpu	Freestyle skiing	Mixed team aerials	10 February
Gold	Yang Wenlong	Snowboarding	Men's big air	10 February
Gold	Xiong Shirui	Snowboarding	Women's big air	10 February
Gold	Gao Tingyu	Speed skating	Men's 500 metres	10 February
Gold	Gao Tingyu; Lian Ziwen; Ning Zhongyan	Speed skating	Men's team sprint	10 February
Gold	Yang Binyu	Speed skating	Women's 3000 metres	10 February
Gold	Feng Junxi; Wang Xue	Freestyle skiing	Women's aerials synchro	11 February
Gold	Liu Mengting	Freestyle skiing	Women's slopestyle	11 February
Gold	Ning Zhongyan	Speed skating	Men's 1000 metres	11 February
Gold	Liu Hanbin; Wu Yu; Hanahati Muhamaiti	Speed skating	Men's team pursuit	11 February
Gold	Han Mei	Speed skating	Women's 1000 metres	11 February
Gold	Yang Binyu; Ahenaer Adake; Han Mei	Speed skating	Women's team pursuit	11 February
Gold	Li Minglin; Ciren Zhandui; Bao Lin; Wang Qiang	Cross-country skiing	Men's 4 × 7.5 kilometre relay	12 February
Gold	Li Lei; Chi Chunxue; Chen Lingshuang; Dinigeer Yilamujiang	Cross-country skiing	Women's 4 × 5 kilometre relay	12 February
Gold	Liu Mengting	Freestyle skiing	Women's big air	12 February
Gold	Cidan Yuzhen; Bu Luer	Ski mountaineering	Mixed relay	12 February
Gold	Tang Jialin; Wen Ying; Chu Yuanmeng; Meng Fanqi	Biathlon	Women's relay	13 February
Silver	Meng Honglian	Cross-country skiing	Women's sprint classical	8 February
Silver	Sheng Haipeng	Freestyle skiing	Men's halfpipe	8 February
Silver	Zhang Kexin	Freestyle skiing	Women's halfpipe	8 February
Silver	Lin Xiaojun	Short-track speed skating	Men's 500 metres	8 February
Silver	Gong Li	Short-track speed skating	Women's 1500 metres	8 February
Silver	Liu Haoyu	Snowboarding	Men's slopestyle	8 February
Silver	Xiong Shirui	Snowboarding	Women's slopestyle	8 February
Silver	Yang Binyu	Speed skating	Women's 1500 metres	8 February
Silver	Dinigeer Yilamujiang	Cross-country skiing	Women's 5 kilometre freestyle	9 February
Silver	Yang Longxiao	Freestyle skiing	Men's aerials	9 February
Silver	Chen Xuezheng	Freestyle skiing	Women's aerials	9 February
Silver	Zhang Chenghao	Ski mountaineering	Men's sprint	9 February
Silver	Yu Jingxuan	Ski mountaineering	Women's sprint	9 February
Silver	Liu Hanbin	Speed skating	Men's 5000 metres	9 February
Silver	Yu Shihui; Tian Ruining; Han Mei	Speed skating	Women's team sprint	9 February
Silver	Jiang Xinjie	Snowboarding	Men's big air	10 February
Silver	Zhang Xiaonan	Snowboarding	Women's big air	10 February
Silver	Han Mei	Speed skating	Women's 3000 metres	10 February
Silver	Meng Fanqi	Biathlon	Women's sprint	11 February
Silver	Geng Hu; Yang Yuheng	Freestyle skiing	Men's aerials synchro	11 February
Silver	Chen Meiting; Xu Mengtao	Freestyle skiing	Women's aerials synchro	11 February
Silver	Yang Ruyi	Freestyle skiing	Women's slopestyle	11 February
Silver	Yin Qi	Speed skating	Women's 1000 metres	11 February
Silver	Xing Jianing; Ren Junfei	Figure skating	Ice dance	12 February
Silver	Han Linshan	Freestyle skiing	Women's big air	12 February
Silver	Yu Jingxuan; Bi Yuxin	Ski mountaineering	Mixed relay	12 February
Silver	Wang Rui; Han Yu; Dong Ziqi; Jiang Jiayi; Su Tingyu	Curling	Women's tournament	14 February
Bronze	Saimuhaer Sailike	Cross-country skiing	Men's sprint classical	8 February
Bronze	Zang Yize	Short-track speed skating	Women's 1500 metres	8 February
Bronze	Yin Qi	Speed skating	Women's 1500 metres	8 February
Bronze	Dinigeer Yilamujiang	Cross-country skiing	Women's sprint classical	8 February
Bronze	Han Yu; Wang Zhiyu	Curling	Mixed doubles	8 February
Bronze	Chi Chunxue	Cross-country skiing	Women's 5 kilometre freestyle	9 February
Bronze	Qi Guangpu	Freestyle skiing	Men's aerials	9 February
Bronze	Liu Shaoang	Short-track speed skating	Men's 1000 metres	9 February
Bronze	Lin Xiaojun; Liu Shaoang; Liu Shaolin; Sun Long; Li Wenlong^{a} Zhu Yiding^{a}	Short-track speed skating	Men's 5000 metre relay	9 February
Bronze	Zhang Chutong	Short-track speed skating	Women's 1000 metres	9 February
Bronze	Bi Yuxin	Ski mountaineering	Men's sprint	9 February
Bronze	Suolang Quzhen	Ski mountaineering	Women's sprint	9 February
Bronze	Hanahati Muhamaiti	Speed skating	Men's 5000 metres	9 February
Bronze	Tian Ruining	Speed skating	Women's 500 metres	9 February
Bronze	Tai Zhien	Speed skating	Women's 3000 metres	10 February
Bronze	Gu Cang	Biathlon	Men's sprint	11 February
Bronze	Tang Jialin	Biathlon	Women's sprint	11 February
Bronze	Li Xinpeng; Qi Guangpu	Freestyle skiing	Men's aerials synchro	11 February
Bronze	Han Linshan	Freestyle skiing	Women's slopestyle	11 February
Bronze	Lian Ziwen	Speed skating	Men's 1000 metres	11 February
Bronze	Yang Ruyi	Freestyle skiing	Women's big air	12 February
Bronze	Suolang Quzhen; Liu Jianbin	Ski mountaineering	Mixed relay	12 February
Bronze	Wu Shaotong	Snowboarding	Women's halfpipe	12 February
Bronze	Hu Weiyao; Wu Hantu; Yan Xingyuan; Gu Cang	Biathlon	Men's relay	13 February
Bronze	Xu Xiaoming; Fei Xueqing; Wang Zhiyu; Li Zhichao; Ye Jianjun	Curling	Men's tournament	14 February
Bronze	China	Ice hockey	Women's tournament	14 February

Medals by sport
Sport	1st place, gold medalist(s)	2nd place, silver medalist(s)	3rd place, bronze medalist(s)	Total
Biathlon	1	1	3	5
Cross-country skiing	5	2	3	10
Curling	0	1	2	3
Figure skating	0	1	0	1
Freestyle skiing	7	8	4	19
Ice hockey	0	0	1	1
Short-track speed skating	2	2	4	8
Ski mountaineering	3	3	3	9
Snowboarding	3	4	1	8
Speed skating	11	5	5	21
Total	32	27	26	85

Medals by date
Day	Date	1st place, gold medalist(s)	2nd place, silver medalist(s)	3rd place, bronze medalist(s)	Total
1	8 February	8	8	5	21
2	9 February	7	7	9	23
3	10 February	6	3	1	10
4	11 February	6	5	5	16
5	12 February	4	3	3	10
6	13 February	1	0	1	2
7	14 February	0	1	2	3
Total		32	27	26	85

Medals by gender
Gender	1st place, gold medalist(s)	2nd place, silver medalist(s)	3rd place, bronze medalist(s)	Total
Female	17	17	13	47
Male	13	8	11	32
Mixed	2	2	2	6
Total	32	27	26	85

^{a} Athletes who participated in the heats only.

== Competitors ==
The following table lists the Chinese delegation per sport and gender.

Sport	Men	Women	Total
Alpine skiing	4	4	8
Biathlon	6	6	12
Cross-country skiing	6	6	12
Curling	5	5	10
Figure skating	5	5	10
Freestyle skiing	10	10	20
Ice hockey	23	23	46
Short-track speed skating	6	6	12
Ski mountaineering	4	4	8
Snowboarding	6	6	12
Speed skating	10	10	20
Total	85	85	170

== Alpine skiing ==
Men

Athlete	Event	Run 1		Run 2		Total	
Athlete	Event	Time	Rank	Time	Rank	Time	Rank
Chao Xinbo	Slalom	48.27	9	47.98	11	1:36.25	9
Li Jinyang	Slalom	50.36	16	50.59	16	1:40.95	15
Liu Xiaochen	Slalom	48.50	10	47.05	7	1:35.55	7
Sun Xinmiao	Slalom	50.18	15	49.19	13	1:39.37	13

Women

Athlete	Event	Run 1		Run 2		Total	
Athlete	Event	Time	Rank	Time	Rank	Time	Rank
Ding Jie	Slalom	55.43	14	DSQ			
Ni Yueming	Slalom	51.38	9	50.50	8	1:41.88	8
Zhang Guiyuan	Slalom	56.79	17	53.37	11	1:50.16	12
Zhang Yuying	Slalom	DSQ					

== Biathlon ==
Men

Athlete	Event	Time	Misses	Rank
Gu Cang	Sprint	30:17.1	1 (0+1)	3rd place, bronze medalist(s)
Hu Weiyao	Sprint	32:02.3	3 (1+2)	11
Song Chen	Sprint	32:27.3	5 (3+2)	14
Yan Xingyuan	Sprint	30:18.0	3 (1+2)	4
Gu Cang; Hu Weiyao; Wu Hantu; Yan Xingyuan	Relay	1:25:32.7	4+12	3rd place, bronze medalist(s)

Women

Athlete	Event	Time	Misses	Rank
Chu Yuanmeng	Sprint	23:18.4	1 (1+0)	6
Meng Fanqi	Sprint	22:47.8	1 (0+1)	2nd place, silver medalist(s)
Tang Jialin	Sprint	23:01.0	1 (0+1)	3rd place, bronze medalist(s)
Yang Lianhong	Sprint	24:01.3	2 (0+2)	9
Chu Yuanmeng; Meng Fanqi; Tang Jialin; Wen Ying	Relay	1:29:06.3	3+11	1st place, gold medalist(s)

== Cross-country skiing ==
Distance
Men

Athlete	Event	Total		
Athlete	Event	Time	Deficit	Rank
Bao Lin	10 km freestyle	21:38.6	+32.1	4
Chen Degen	10 km freestyle	22:10.5	+1:04.0	9
Li Minglin	10 km freestyle	21:52.8	+46.3	7
Wang Qiang	10 km freestyle	21:50.2	+43.7	5
Bao Lin; Ciren Zhandui; Li Minglin; Wang Qiang	4 × 7.5 km relay	1:12:09.6	-	1st place, gold medalist(s)

Women

Athlete	Event	Total		
Athlete	Event	Time	Deficit	Rank
Bayani Jialin	5 km freestyle	12:07.5	-	1st place, gold medalist(s)
Chen Lingshuang	5 km freestyle	12:24.6	+17.1	4
Chi Chunxue	5 km freestyle	12:17.5	+10.0	3rd place, bronze medalist(s)
Dinigeer Yilamujiang	5 km freestyle	12:11.1	+3.6	2nd place, silver medalist(s)
Chen Lingshuang; Chi Chunxue; Dinigeer Yilamujiang; Li Lei	4 × 5 km relay	53:59.3	-	1st place, gold medalist(s)

Sprint
Men

Athlete	Event	Qualification		Quarterfinals		Semifinals		Final	
Athlete	Event	Time	Rank	Time	Rank	Time	Rank	Time	Rank
Ciren Zhandui	Sprint classical	3:02.32	3 Q	3:05.37	1 Q	3:01.45	3	Did not advance	
Li Minglin	Sprint classical	3:09.43	9 Q	3:13.19	3	Did not advance			
Saimuhaer Sailike	Sprint classical	3:02.18	2 Q	3:12.74	2 Q	3:00.87	2 Q	2:58.51	3rd place, bronze medalist(s)
Wang Qiang	Sprint classical	2:56.51	1 Q	3:06.24	1 Q	2:57.93	1 Q	2:56.19	1st place, gold medalist(s)

Women

Athlete	Event	Qualification		Quarterfinals		Semifinals		Final	
Athlete	Event	Time	Rank	Time	Rank	Time	Rank	Time	Rank
Chen Lingshuang	Sprint classical	3:35.15	2 Q	3:44.35	1 Q	3:31.44	1 Q	DSQ	
Dinigeer Yilamujiang	Sprint classical	3:40.64	5 Q	3:40.05	1 Q	3:29.61	2 Q	3:28.56	3rd place, bronze medalist(s)
Li Lei	Sprint classical	3:50.38	9 Q	3:45.30	2 Q	3:31.77	2 Q	3:25.25	1st place, gold medalist(s)
Meng Honglian	Sprint classical	3:31.39	1 Q	3:34.86	1 Q	3:29.12	1 Q	3:25.91	2nd place, silver medalist(s)

== Curling ==
Summary

Team	Event	Group stage									Qualification	Semifinal	Final / BM	
Team	Event	Opposition Score	Opposition Score	Opposition Score	Opposition Score	Opposition Score	Opposition Score	Opposition Score	Opposition Score	Rank	Opposition Score	Opposition Score	Opposition Score	Rank
Xu Xiaoming; Fei Xueqing; Wang Zhiyu; Li Zhichao; Ye Jianjun	Men's tournament	Hong Kong; W 9–2	Saudi Arabia; W 19–1	Qatar; W 11–1	Thailand; W 16–1	Japan; W 8–5	—N/a			1 Q	Bye	Philippines; L 6–7	Hong Kong; W 10–3	3rd place, bronze medalist(s)
Wang Rui; Han Yu; Dong Ziqi; Jiang Jiayi; Su Tingyu	Women's tournament	Thailand; W 19–1	Chinese Taipei; W 14–2	Qatar; W 14–0	Kazakhstan; W 11–4	Hong Kong; W 9–3	South Korea; L 3–4	Philippines; W 9–5	Japan; W 6–2	2 Q	—N/a	Japan; W 5–2	South Korea; L 2–7	2nd place, silver medalist(s)
Han Yu; Wang Zhiyu	Mixed doubles	Kazakhstan; W 11–5	Kyrgyzstan; W 8–3	Philippines; W 9–6	South Korea; W 6–4	Qatar; W 10–1	—N/a			1 Q	Bye	South Korea; L 4–8	Philippines; W 6–5	3rd place, bronze medalist(s)

=== Men's tournament ===
Round robin

Pos	Team	Skip	Pld	W	L	W–L	PF	PA	DSC	Qualification
1	China	Xu Xiaoming	5	5	0	—	63	10	36.46	Semifinals
2	Hong Kong	Jason Chang	5	4	1	—	50	16	62.23	Qualification
3	Japan	Ryo Aoki	5	3	2	—	52	21	63.73	Qualification
4	Qatar	Nasser Al-Yafei	5	2	3	—	21	41	138.50	
5	Saudi Arabia	Munir Al-Beelbisi	5	1	4	—	22	55	128.47	
6	Thailand	Kaewjeen / Mahattanasakul	5	0	5	—	8	73	130.14	

Source: Official website

China had a bye in draws 3, 5, 7 and 8.

Draw 1

Sunday, 9 February, 13:00

Sheet C	1	2	3	4	5	6	7	8	Final
China 🔨	3	0	0	2	2	2	0	X	9
Hong Kong	0	0	1	0	0	0	1	X	2

Draw 2

Sunday, 9 February, 21:00

Sheet B	1	2	3	4	5	6	7	8	Final
China 🔨	4	3	3	5	0	4	X	X	19
Saudi Arabia	0	0	0	0	1	0	X	X	1

Draw 4

Monday, 10 February, 14:00

Sheet E	1	2	3	4	5	6	7	8	Final
Qatar	0	0	0	0	1	0	X	X	1
China 🔨	3	1	3	1	0	3	X	X	11

Draw 6

Tuesday, 11 February, 14:00

Sheet D	1	2	3	4	5	6	7	8	Final
China 🔨	5	2	3	1	5	0	X	X	16
Thailand	0	0	0	0	0	1	X	X	1

Draw 9

Wednesday, 12 February, 19:00

Sheet A	1	2	3	4	5	6	7	8	Final
Japan 🔨	2	0	0	2	0	1	0	0	5
China	0	1	0	0	2	0	2	3	8

Semifinal

Thursday, 13 February, 19:00

Sheet E	1	2	3	4	5	6	7	8	Final
Philippines	0	0	1	0	4	1	0	1	7
China 🔨	0	2	0	2	0	0	2	0	6

Bronze medal game

Friday, 14 February, 9:00

Sheet C	1	2	3	4	5	6	7	8	Final
China 🔨	3	0	2	0	2	0	3	X	10
Hong Kong	0	1	0	1	0	1	0	X	3

=== Women's tournament ===
Round robin

Pos	Team	Skip	Pld	W	L	W–L	PF	PA	DSC	Qualification
1	South Korea	Gim Eun-ji	8	8	0	—	63	14	45.90	Semifinals
2	China	Wang Rui	8	7	1	—	85	21	38.69	Semifinals
3	Japan	Yuina Miura	8	6	2	—	68	30	58.25	Semifinals
4	Kazakhstan	Angelina Ebauyer	8	5	3	—	55	39	54.81	Semifinals
5	Philippines	Kathleen Dubberstein	8	4	4	—	61	36	85.56	
6	Hong Kong	Hung Ling Yue	8	3	5	—	44	45	115.69	
7	Chinese Taipei	Yang Ko	8	2	6	—	29	75	107.27	
8	Thailand	Phichayathida Jaosap	8	1	7	—	19	91	128.48	
9	Qatar	Amna Al-Qaet	8	0	8	—	11	84	180.65	

Source: Official website

China had a bye in draws 8.

Draw 1

Sunday, 9 February, 9:00

Sheet C	1	2	3	4	5	6	7	8	Final
China 🔨	3	7	5	2	2	0	X	X	19
Thailand	0	0	0	0	0	1	X	X	1

Draw 2

Sunday, 9 February, 17:00

Sheet D	1	2	3	4	5	6	7	8	Final
China 🔨	8	0	2	3	0	1	X	X	14
Chinese Taipei	0	1	0	0	1	0	X	X	2

Draw 3

Monday, 10 February, 9:00

Sheet B	1	2	3	4	5	6	7	8	Final
Qatar 🔨	0	0	0	0	0	0	X	X	0
China	3	4	2	3	2	0	X	X	14

Draw 4

Monday, 10 February, 19:00

Sheet A	1	2	3	4	5	6	7	8	Final
China 🔨	3	2	0	3	1	0	2	X	11
Kazakhstan	0	0	2	0	0	2	0	X	4

Draw 5

Tuesday, 11 February, 9:00

Sheet D	1	2	3	4	5	6	7	8	Final
Hong Kong	0	0	0	0	2	1	0	X	3
China 🔨	2	1	2	1	0	0	3	X	9

Draw 6

Tuesday, 11 February, 19:00

Sheet B	1	2	3	4	5	6	7	8	Final
China 🔨	0	1	1	0	0	0	1	0	3
South Korea	0	0	0	1	1	1	0	1	4

Draw 7

Wednesday, 12 February, 9:00

Sheet E	1	2	3	4	5	6	7	8	Final
Philippines	0	1	0	2	0	1	1	X	5
China 🔨	3	0	2	0	4	0	0	X	9

Draw 9

Thursday, 13 February, 9:00

Sheet C	1	2	3	4	5	6	7	8	Final
Japan	0	1	0	0	0	1	0	0	2
China 🔨	0	0	0	1	2	0	2	1	6

Semifinal

Thursday, 13 February, 19:00

Sheet B	1	2	3	4	5	6	7	8	Final
China 🔨	1	0	0	1	0	1	2	X	5
Japan	0	0	0	0	2	0	0	X	2

Gold medal game

Friday, 14 February, 13:00

Sheet C	1	2	3	4	5	6	7	8	Final
China	0	0	2	0	0	0	0	X	2
South Korea 🔨	1	2	0	1	0	1	2	X	7

=== Mixed doubles tournament ===
Round robin

Pos	Team	Athletes	Pld	W	L	W–L	PF	PA	DSC	Qualification
1	China	Han / Wang	5	5	0	—	44	19	37.46	Semifinals
2	Philippines	Dubberstein / Pfister	5	4	1	—	50	22	58.24	Qualification
3	South Korea	Kim / Seong	5	3	2	—	50	22	47.83	Qualification
4	Kazakhstan	Seitzhanova / Nadirbayev	5	2	3	—	26	43	55.33	
5	Kyrgyzstan	Asanbaeva / Abykeev	5	1	4	—	21	50	114.23	
6	Qatar	Al-Abdulla / Al-Yafei	5	0	5	—	15	50	98.31	

Source: Official website

China had a bye in draws 2, 4 and 7.

Draw 1

Tuesday, 4 February, 10:00

Sheet C	1	2	3	4	5	6	7	8	Final
China	1	2	0	3	4	0	1	X	11
Kazakhstan 🔨	0	0	1	0	0	4	0	X	5

Draw 3

Wednesday, 5 February, 10:00

Sheet D	1	2	3	4	5	6	7	8	Final
Kyrgyzstan	0	1	0	0	2	0	0	X	3
China 🔨	1	0	2	2	0	1	2	X	8

Draw 5

Wednesday, 5 February, 18:00

Sheet E	1	2	3	4	5	6	7	8	Final
China 🔨	4	2	1	1	0	1	0	X	9
Philippines	0	0	0	0	3	0	3	X	6

Draw 6

Thursday, 6 February, 10:00

Sheet B	1	2	3	4	5	6	7	8	Final
South Korea	1	0	1	0	1	0	1	X	4
China 🔨	0	2	0	1	0	3	0	X	6

Draw 8

Thursday, 6 February, 18:00

Sheet A	1	2	3	4	5	6	7	8	Final
Qatar	0	0	0	0	0	1	X	X	1
China 🔨	4	3	1	1	1	0	X	X	10

Semifinal

Friday, 7 February, 13:00

Sheet C	1	2	3	4	5	6	7	8	Final
China 🔨	0	2	0	0	0	2	0	0	4
South Korea	1	0	3	1	1	0	1	1	8

Bronze medal game

Saturday, 8 February, 9:00

Sheet B	1	2	3	4	5	6	7	8	Final
Philippines	1	3	0	0	0	0	0	1	5
China 🔨	0	0	1	2	1	1	1	0	6

== Figure skating ==
Athlete	Event	SP / SD		FS / FD		Total	
Athlete	Event	Points	Rank	Points	Rank	Points	Rank
Chen Yudong	Men's singles	67.52	7	135.80	7	203.32	7
Dai Daiwei	Men's singles	82.89	3	155.94	5	238.83	4
An Xiangyi	Women's singles	62.96	5	98.75	8	161.71	6
Zhu Yi	Women's singles	62.90	6	105.96	5	168.86	5
Wang Yuchen; Zhu Lei	Pairs	52.05	5	91.71	5	143.76	5
Ren Junfei; Xing Jianing	Ice dance	64.29	2	106.96	1	171.25	2nd place, silver medalist(s)
Xiao Zixi; He Linghao	Ice dance	62.64	4	97.34	4	159.98	4

== Freestyle skiing ==
Aerials
Men

Athlete	Event	Final 1				Final 2			
Athlete	Event	Run 1	Run 2	Best	Rank	Run 1	Run 2	Best	Rank
Li Xinpeng	Aerials	44.25	104.49	104.49	2 Q	—N/a		123.45	1st place, gold medalist(s)
Qi Guangpu	Aerials	124.78	DNS	124.78	1 Q	—N/a		119.47	3rd place, bronze medalist(s)
Yang Longxiao	Aerials	87.61	90.72	90.72	4 Q	—N/a		122.13	2nd place, silver medalist(s)
Yang Yuheng	Aerials	93.06	91.65	93.06	3 Q	—N/a		102.57	4
Li Xinpeng; Qi Guangpu	Synchro aerials	—N/a				91.57	88.19	91.57	3rd place, bronze medalist(s)
Geng Hu; Yang Yuheng	Synchro aerials	—N/a				78.25	93.48	93.48	2nd place, silver medalist(s)

Women

Athlete	Event	Final 1				Final 2			
Athlete	Event	Run 1	Run 2	Best	Rank	Run 1	Run 2	Best	Rank
Chen Meiting	Aerials	80.96	DNF	80.96	2 Q	—N/a		71.97	4
Chen Xuezheng	Aerials	39.44	72.45	72.45	4 Q	—N/a		81.58	2nd place, silver medalist(s)
Feng Junxi	Aerials	76.23	DNF	76.23	3 Q	—N/a		71.50	5
Xu Mengtao	Aerials	97.99	DNS	97.99	1 Q	—N/a		90.94	1st place, gold medalist(s)
Chen Meiting; Xu Mengtao	Synchro aerials	—N/a				84.86	80.51	84.86	2nd place, silver medalist(s)
Feng Junxi; Wang Xue	Synchro aerials	—N/a				87.12	84.67	87.12	1st place, gold medalist(s)

Mixed

Athlete	Event	Final	
Athlete	Event	Best	Rank
Li Xinpeng; Qi Guangpu; Xu Mengtao	Aerials	305.64	1st place, gold medalist(s)

Half pipe, Slopestyle and Big Air
Men

Athlete	Event	Final				
Athlete	Event	Run 1	Run 2	Run 3	Best	Rank
Lin Hao	Big air	73.75	68.25	76.75	150.50	5
Sheng Haipeng	Halfpipe	90.50	DNI	DNI	90.50	2nd place, silver medalist(s)
Su Shuaibing	Halfpipe	82.25	DNI	DNI	82.25	6
Sun Jingbo	Halfpipe	86.25	DNI	DNI	86.25	5
Lin Hao	Slopestyle	69.75	DNI	78.50	78.50	4

Women

Athlete	Event	Final				
Athlete	Event	Run 1	Run 2	Run 3	Best	Rank
Han Linshan	Big air	83.00	79.75	DNI	162.75	2nd place, silver medalist(s)
Liu Mengting	Big air	91.75	83.75	DNI	175.50	1st place, gold medalist(s)
Yang Ruyi	Big air	80.50	76.75	82.75	159.50	3rd place, bronze medalist(s)
Li Fanghui	Halfpipe	93.00	DNI	95.25	95.25	1st place, gold medalist(s)
Zhang Kexin	Halfpipe	87.50	89.25	DNI	89.25	2nd place, silver medalist(s)
Han Linshan	Slopestyle	87.00	DNI	DNI	87.00	3rd place, bronze medalist(s)
Liu Mengting	Slopestyle	94.00	DNI	DNI	94.00	1st place, gold medalist(s)
Yang Ruyi	Slopestyle	45.00	90.50	DNI	90.50	2nd place, silver medalist(s)

== Ice hockey ==
Summary

Key:

- OT – Overtime
- GWS – Match decided by penalty-shootout

Team	Event	Group stage						Qualification Playoffs	Quarterfinal	Semifinal	Final / BM	
Team	Event	Opposition Score	Opposition Score	Opposition Score	Opposition Score	Opposition Score	Rank	Opposition Score	Opposition Score	Opposition Score	Opposition Score	Rank
China men's	Men	South Korea; L 5–6 OT	Kazakhstan; L 1–6	Thailand; W 8–0	Chinese Taipei; W 5–0	Japan; L 1–2	4 Q	Bye	Chinese Taipei; W 7–2	Kazakhstan; L 1–3	South Korea; L 2–5	4
China women's	Women	South Korea; W 2–1	Kazakhstan; L 1–2	Japan; L 1–8	—N/a							3rd place, bronze medalist(s)

=== Men's tournament ===
Group play

Pos	Team	Pld	W	OW	OL	L	GF	GA	GD	Pts	Qualification
1	Kazakhstan	5	5	0	0	0	41	3	+38	15	Quarterfinals
2	South Korea	5	3	1	0	1	36	10	+26	11	Quarterfinals
3	Japan	5	3	0	0	2	28	11	+17	9	Quarterfinals
4	China	5	2	0	1	2	20	14	+6	7	Quarterfinals
5	Chinese Taipei	5	1	0	0	4	4	52	−48	3	Quarterfinals
6	Thailand	5	0	0	0	5	2	41	−39	0	Quarterfinals

Source: OCA

4 February; 20:00	China	5–6 OT (2–1, 2–2, 1–2) (OT: 0–1)	South Korea	Harbin Ice Hockey Arena, Harbin; Attendance: 2,916

Game reference

Chen Shifeng
Goalies
Lee Yeon-seung
Referees:
Anton Boryayev (KAZ)
Konstantin Chubenko (KAZ)

	0–1	06:32 – Lee C. (Kim S.W., Nam)
Zhang J. (Guo, Zhang P.) – 09:15	1–1
Yan (Zhang J., Zhang Z.) – 17:36	2–1
Zheng (Wang, Chen Z.) – 24:13	3–1
Guo (Zhang Z., Zhang P.) – 24:43	4–1
	4–2	34:31 – Ahn (Lee C., Kim S.W.)
	4–3	36:17 – Kim S.Y. (Kim S.H., Kim W.)
	4–4	47:53 – Kim S.Y. (Kong, Kim S.W.) (PP)
Yu J. – 52:50	5–4
	5–5	55:00 – Lee C. (Kang Y., Nam) (PP)
	5–6	64:15 – Kim S.W. (Nam, Lee C.)

12 min
Penalties
4 min
14
Shots
47

5 February; 20:00	Kazakhstan	6–1 (3–0, 1–0, 2–1)	China	Harbin Ice Hockey Arena, Harbin; Attendance: 3,046

Game reference

Andrey Shutov
Goalies
Sun Zehao
Referees:
Chae Young-jin (KOR)
Kang Tae-woo (KOR)

Breus (Savitskiy, Panyukov) – 00:42	1–0
Grents (Daniyar, Savitskiy) (PP) – 02:59	2–0
Starchenko (Rymarev, Daniyar) – 07:47	3–0
Rymarev (Mikhailov) – 24:42	4–0
Kolesnikov (Buyalskiy, Breus) – 45:02	5–0
Kolesnikov (Borissevich, Chaporov) – 48:53	6–0
	6–1	55:18 – Zhang P. (Zheng, Wang) (PP2)

8 min
Penalties
6 min
44
Shots
9

7 February; 12:30	Thailand	0–8 (0–3, 0–3, 0–2)	China	Harbin Ice Hockey Arena, Harbin; Attendance: 3,060

Game reference

Ben Kleineschay
Goalies
Chen Shifeng
Referees:
Kang Tae-woo (KOR)
Timur Morev (KAZ)

0–1	06:50 – Yan (Guo, Zhang Z.)
0–2	09:52 – Yu J. (Li M., Zuo)
0–3	14:50 – Yan (Hou) (SH)
0–4	28:06 – Zhang P. (Hou, Wang) (PP)
0–5	29:44 – Zhang Z. (Guo, Zhang P.)
0–6	30:41 – Wang (Hou, Zheng)
0–7	52:07 – Wang
0–8	56:51 – Yan (Zhang P., Zhang Z.)

10 min
Penalties
10 min
17
Shots
49

8 February; 20:00	China	5–0 (4–0, 0–0, 1–0)	Chinese Taipei	Harbin Ice Hockey Arena, Harbin; Attendance: 3,101

Game reference

Sun Zehao
Goalies
Chen Tai-yu
Lee Yi-cheng
Referees:
Anton Boryayev (KAZ)
Konstantin Chubenko (KAZ)

Hou (Han) – 00:56	1–0
Yu J. (Yan, Zuo) (PP) – 03:32	2–0
Zhang Z. (SH) – 06:12	3–0
Yan (Han, Zhang Z.) (PP) – 14:14	4–0
Wang (Zhang P., Hou) (PP) – 50:15	5–0

8 min
Penalties
10 min
51
Shots
14

10 February; 20:00	Japan	2–1 (0–1, 1–0, 1–0)	China	Harbin Ice Hockey Arena, Harbin; Attendance: 3,288

Game reference

Yuta Narisawa
Goalies
Chen Shifeng
Referees:
Konstantin Chubenko (KAZ)
Timur Morev (KAZ)

	0–1	01:36 – Hou (Han)
Ishida (H. Sato, Kobayashi) (PP) – 34:09	1–1
Takagi (Ishida) – 51:30	2–1

10 min
Penalties
10 min
37
Shots
21

Quarterfinal

11 February; 20:00	China	7–2 (1–1, 2–0, 4–1)	Chinese Taipei	Harbin Ice Hockey Arena, Harbin; Attendance: 3,211

Game reference

Sun Zehao
Goalies
Lee Yi-cheng
Chen Tai-yu
Referees:
Anton Boryayev (KAZ)
Konstantin Chubenko (KAZ)

	0–1	06:23 – Chen K. (Wang P.)
Zhang Z. (Zhang P., Zuo) (PP) – 09:27	1–1
Yan (Han, Zuo) – 28:32	2–1
Zhang P. (Hou, Wang) (PP) – 35:10	3–1
Chen K. (Zhang Z., Zhang P.) – 41:17	4–1
Hou (Wang, Han) – 42:55	5–1
Yu J. (Hou) – 48:04	6–1
Zhang P. (Hou, Zhang J.) (PP) – 50:01	7–1
	7–2	51:04 – Lin J. (Lin H.)

2 min
Penalties
18 min
65
Shots
16

Semifinal

13 February; 10:00	Kazakhstan	3–1 (0–0, 2–0, 1–1)	China	Harbin Ice Hockey Arena, Harbin; Attendance: 3,144

Game reference

Andrey Shutov
Goalies
Chen Shifeng
Referees:
Chae Young-jin (KOR)
Shen Yen-chin (TPE)

Starchenko (Rymarev, Beketayev) – 36:45	1–0
Grents (Mikhailov, Ospanov) – 39:47	2–0
	2–1	Wang (Li M.) – 58:47
Breus (Likhotnikov) – 59:12	3–1

10 min
Penalties
8 min
58
Shots
12

Bronze medal game

14 February; 10:00	South Korea	5–2 (0–1, 3–0, 2–1)	China	Harbin Ice Hockey Arena, Harbin; Attendance: 3,035

Game reference

Lee Yeon-seung
Goalies
Chen Shifeng
Referees:
Anton Boryayev (KAZ)
Timur Morev (KAZ)

	0–1	07:27 – Li Z. (Hou, Yu J.)
Oh (Kang Y.) – 26:27	1–1
Kim S.Y. (Lee H., Kim W.) – 35:30	2–1
Kong (Kim S.W., Kang M.) – 39:46	3–1
	3–2	42:00 – Zhang Z. (Yan)
Lee C. (Lee S.) (PP) – 43:06	4–2
Lee S. (Lee C., Ahn) (PP) – 48:10	5–2

12 min
Penalties
14 min
40
Shots
22

=== Women's tournament ===
Group play

Pos	Team	Pld	W	OW	OL	L	GF	GA	GD	Pts
1	Japan	3	3	0	0	0	18	1	+17	9
2	Kazakhstan	3	2	0	0	1	5	5	0	6
3	China	3	1	0	0	2	4	11	−7	3
4	South Korea	3	0	0	0	3	1	11	−10	0

Source: OCA

12 February; 14:00	China	2–1 (1–0, 0–1, 1–0)	South Korea	Harbin Sport University Stadium, Harbin; Attendance: 1,187

Game reference

Lai Guimin
Goalies
Kim Yeon-ju
Referees:
Miyuki Nakayama (JPN)
Wan Mei Wah (MAS)

Wu (Wang J.) – 10:50	1–0
	1–1	25:44 – Eom (Park Ji-Y.)
Fang (Wang J., Kong) – 48:38	2–1

9 min
Penalties
6 min
24
Shots
24

13 February; 14:00	China	1–2 (0–0, 0–1, 1–1)	Kazakhstan	Harbin Sport University Stadium, Harbin; Attendance: 1,167

Game reference

Lai Guimin
Goalies
Arina Chshyokolova
Referees:
Miyuki Nakayama (JPN)
Wan Mei Wah (MAS)

	0–1	35:29 – Filimonova (Shegay, Orazbayeva) (PP)
Wang J. (Qu) – 42:36	1–1
	1–2	48:37 – Shegay (Orazbayeva)

8 min
Penalties
0 min
34
Shots
23

14 February; 14:00	Japan	8–1 (3–1, 2–0, 3–0)	China	Harbin Sport University Stadium, Harbin; Attendance: 1,198

Game reference

Miyuu Masuhara
Goalies
Lai Guimin
Wang Yuqing
Referees:
Liu Lu (CHN)
Miyuki Nakayama (JPN)

Koyama (Ito) – 02:51	1–0
	1–1	06:59 – Kong (Yu) (PP)
Shiga (Ukita, Koyama) – 08:10	2–1
Ito (Ukita) (PP) – 16:42	3–1
Maeda (Koike, Hosoyamada) – 30:01	4–1
Koyama (Koike, Hosoyamada) (PP) – 32:10	5–1
Miura (Ukita) – 40:34	6–1
Ukita (Miura, Ito) – 42:40	7–1
H. Yamashita – 46:07	8–1

6 min
Penalties
8 min
40
Shots
13

== Short-track speed skating ==
Men

Athlete	Event	Heat		Quarterfinal		Semifinal		Final	
Athlete	Event	Time	Rank	Time	Rank	Time	Rank	Time	Rank
Lin Xiaojun	500 m	41.337	1 Q	41.325	1 Q	40.930	1 FA	41.150	1st place, gold medalist(s)
Liu Shaoang	500 m	41.326	1 Q	40.933	3 q	1:24.670	5 FB	42.386	5
Sun Long	500 m	41.107	1 Q	40.873	1 Q	40.667	2 FA	42.676	4
Lin Xiaojun	1000 m	1:30.879	1 Q	1:28.347	2 Q	PEN		Did not advance	
Liu Shaoang	1000 m	1:30.539	1 Q	1:27.720	2 Q	1:25.996	1 FA	1:28.905	3rd place, bronze medalist(s)
Sun Long	1000 m	1:34.753	1 Q	1:27.099	1 Q	1:26.056	1 FA	1:44.169	5
Lin Xiaojun	1500 m	—N/a		2:29.944	2 Q	2:25.880	1 FA	2:16.956	2nd place, silver medalist(s)
Liu Shaoang	1500 m	—N/a		2:16.538	1 Q	2:31.720	2 FA	2:18.661	5
Sun Long	1500 m	—N/a		2:30.516	1 Q	2:31.689	1 FA	2:20.064	6
Lin Xiaojun; Liu Shaoang; Liu Shaolin; Li Wenlong^{[a]} Sun Long; Zhu Yiding^{[a]}	5000 m relay	—N/a				7:10.291	1 FA	7:03.909	3rd place, bronze medalist(s)

Women

Athlete	Event	Heat		Quarterfinal		Semifinal		Final	
Athlete	Event	Time	Rank	Time	Rank	Time	Rank	Time	Rank
Fan Kexin	500 m	43.744	1 Q	44.772	1 Q	44.058	4 FB	DNS	
Wang Xinran	500 m	44.103	1 Q	44.394	1 Q	1:09.423	4 ADVA	43.274	4
Zhang Chutong	500 m	43.759	1 Q	43.183	1 Q	43.940	3 FB	44.084	6
Gong Li	1000 m	1:34.991	1 Q	1:32.671	1 Q	2:15.047	5 FB	1:36.756	6
Yang Jingru	1000 m	1:35.107	2 Q	1:32.769	2 Q	PEN		Did not advance	
Zhang Chutong	1000 m	1:40.674	1 Q	1:31.341	1 Q	1:31.357	2 FA	1:29.836	3rd place, bronze medalist(s)
Gong Li	1500 m	—N/a		2:30.820	1 Q	2:42.802	1 FA	2:23.884	2nd place, silver medalist(s)
Yang Jingru	1500 m	—N/a		2:34.800	1 Q	2:32.710	1 FA	3:18.179	7
Zang Yize	1500 m	—N/a		2:35.398	2 Q	2:32.881	2 FA	2:23.965	3rd place, bronze medalist(s)
Fan Kexin; Gong Li; Wang Xinran; Yang Jingru^{[a]} Zang Yize^{[a]} Zhang Chutong	3000 m relay	—N/a				4:13.862	1 FA	4:11.371	1st place, gold medalist(s)

Mixed

Athlete	Event	Quarterfinal		Semifinal		Final	
Athlete	Event	Time	Rank	Time	Rank	Time	Rank
Fan Kexin; Gong Li; Lin Xiaojun; Liu Shaoang; Liu Shaolin^{[a]} Sun Long^{[a]} Wang Xinran^{[a]} Zhang Chutong^{[a]}	2000 m relay	2:46.652	1 Q	2:40.241	1 FA	2:59.017	4

Qualification legend: FA - Qualify to medal final; FB - Qualify to consolation final ^{a} Skaters who participated in the heats only.

== Ski mountaineering ==
Athlete	Event	Qualification		Semifinal		Final	
Athlete	Event	Time	Rank	Time	Rank	Time	Rank
Bi Yuxin	Men's sprint	2:41.22	1	2:41.46	2	2:25.65	3rd place, bronze medalist(s)
Bu Luer	Men's sprint	2:48.20	4	2:40.65	1	2:22.29	1st place, gold medalist(s)
Liu Jianbin	Men's sprint	2:41.48	2	2:37.68	2	2:34.88	4
Zhang Chenghao	Men's sprint	2:44.02	3	2:35.65	1	2:22.91	2nd place, silver medalist(s)
Cidan Yuzhen	Women's sprint	3:09.31	1 Q	3:20.17	2 Q	2:55.88	1st place, gold medalist(s)
Ji Lulu	Women's sprint	3:18.24	3 Q	3:18.50	2 Q	3:04.31	4
Suolang Quzhen	Women's sprint	3:17.75	2 Q	3:16.67	1 Q	3:01.78	3rd place, bronze medalist(s)
Yu Jingxuan	Women's sprint	3:29.13	4 Q	3:19.36	1 Q	2:59.84	2nd place, silver medalist(s)
Cidan Yuzhen; Bu Luer	Mixed relay	14:35.56	2	—N/a		27:48.67	1st place, gold medalist(s)
Suolang Quzhen; Liu Jianbin	Mixed relay	14:44.51	3	—N/a		29:27.67	3rd place, bronze medalist(s)
Yu Jingxuan; Bi Yuxin	Mixed relay	15:01.15	4	—N/a		28:20.96	2nd place, silver medalist(s)

== Snowboarding ==
Men

Athlete	Event	Qualification				Final				
Athlete	Event	Run 1	Run 2	Best	Rank	Run 1	Run 2	Run 3	Best	Rank
Ge Chunyu	Big air	—N/a				31.50	58.25	28.75	87.00	6
Jiang Xinjie	Big air	—N/a				83.25	77.00	10.50	160.25	2nd place, silver medalist(s)
Liu Haoyu	Big air	—N/a				69.75	86.75	DNI	156.50	4
Yang Wenlong	Big air	—N/a				95.50	85.00	97.75	193.25	1st place, gold medalist(s)
Gu Ao	Halfpipe	10.00	36.50	36.50	7	Cancelled				
Wang Ziyang	Halfpipe	20.25	31.00	31.00	8	Cancelled				
Ge Chunyu	Slopestyle	28.75	57.00	57.00	6	59.00	DNI	DNI	59.00	7
Jiang Xinjie	Slopestyle	59.00	77.25	77.25	3	70.50	DNI	DNI	70.50	4
Liu Haoyu	Slopestyle	37.75	DNI	37.75	8	50.00	DNI	76.00	76.00	2nd place, silver medalist(s)
Yang Wenlong	Slopestyle	78.50	93.25	93.25	1	67.25	DNI	DNI	67.25	6

Women

Athlete	Event	Qualification				Final				
Athlete	Event	Run 1	Run 2	Best	Rank	Run 1	Run 2	Run 3	Best	Rank
Xiong Shirui	Big air	—N/a				75.75	88.25	DNI	164.00	1st place, gold medalist(s)
Zhang Xiaonan	Big air	—N/a				78.00	78.75	DNI	156.75	2nd place, silver medalist(s)
Cai Xuetong	Halfpipe	83.00	DNI	83.00	4	Cancelled				
Liu Yibo	Halfpipe	77.50	DNI	77.50	5	Cancelled				
Wu Shaotong	Halfpipe	86.50	DNI	86.50	3rd place, bronze medalist(s)	Cancelled				
Yang Lu	Halfpipe	71.75	DNI	71.75	6	Cancelled				
Xiong Shirui	Slopestyle	—N/a				75.25	DNI	DNI	75.25	2nd place, silver medalist(s)
Zhang Xiaonan	Slopestyle	—N/a				80.75	88.75	95.25	95.25	1st place, gold medalist(s)

== Speed skating ==
Men

Athlete	Event	Time	Rank
Gao Tingyu	100 m	9.35	1st place, gold medalist(s)
Lian Ziwen	100 m	10.04	16
Liu Bin	100 m	9.802	7
Xue Zhiwen	100 m	9.71	6
Du Haonan	500 m	35.49	11
Gao Tingyu	500 m	34.95	1st place, gold medalist(s)
Lian Ziwen	500 m	35.20	7
Xue Zhiwen	500 m	35.54	12
Du Haonan	1000 m	1:11.62	12
Lian Ziwen	1000 m	1:09.68	3rd place, bronze medalist(s)
Ning Zhongyan	1000 m	1:08.81	1st place, gold medalist(s)
Liu Hanbin	1500 m	1:48.99	5
Ning Zhongyan	1500 m	1:45.85	1st place, gold medalist(s)
Sun Chuanyi	1500 m	1:51.24	11
Hanahati Muhamaiti	5000 m	6:31.54	3rd place, bronze medalist(s)
Liu Hanbin	5000 m	6:29.93	2nd place, silver medalist(s)
Wu Yu	5000 m	6:27.82	1st place, gold medalist(s)
Hanahati Muhamaiti; Liu Hanbin; Wu Yu	Team pursuit	3:45.94	1st place, gold medalist(s)
Gao Tingyu; Lian Ziwen; Ning Zhongyan	Team sprint	1:19.22	1st place, gold medalist(s)

Women

Athlete	Event	Time	Rank
Tian Ruining	100 m	10.52	4
Wang Jingziqian	100 m	10.57	5
Xu Meng	100 m	10.827	12
Yu Shihui	100 m	10.70	6
Tian Ruining	500 m	38.57	3rd place, bronze medalist(s)
Wang Jingziqian	500 m	38.87	4
Xu Meng	500 m	39.20	9
Yu Shihui	500 m	39.27	10
Han Mei	1000 m	1:15.85	1st place, gold medalist(s)
Xu Meng	1000 m	1:19.50	11
Yin Qi	1000 m	1:16.08	2nd place, silver medalist(s)
Yu Shihui	1000 m	1:23.92	17
Ahenaer Adake	1500 m	2:01.45	11
Han Mei	1500 m	1:57.58	1st place, gold medalist(s)
Yang Binyu	1500 m	1:58.06	2nd place, silver medalist(s)
Yin Qi	1500 m	1:58.09	3rd place, bronze medalist(s)
Han Mei	3000 m	4:09.06	2nd place, silver medalist(s)
Tai Zhien	3000 m	4:12.01	3rd place, bronze medalist(s)
Yang Binyu	3000 m	4:08.54	1st place, gold medalist(s)
Ahenaer Adake; Han Mei; Yang Binyu	Team pursuit	3:02.75	1st place, gold medalist(s)
Han Mei; Tian Ruining; Yu Shihui	Team sprint	1:28.85	2nd place, silver medalist(s)
