= Freestyle skiing at the 2025 Asian Winter Games =

- Venue: Yabuli Ski Resort
- Dates: 8–12 February 2025
- Competitors: 51 from 8 nations

Freestyle skiing competitions at the 2025 Asian Winter Games in Harbin, China, were held at Yabuli Ski Resort between 8 and 12 February 2025. The freestyle skiing competition was originally scheduled to end on 13 February but the last event was held a day early on 12 February due to weather conditions.

Thailand won its first Asian Winter Games medal.

== Schedule ==
Q	Qualification	F	Final

Event↓/Date →	8th Sat	9th Sun		10th Mon	11th Tue	12th Wed
Men's aerials		Q	F			
Men's aerials synchro					F	
Men's big air						F
Men's halfpipe	F					
Men's slopestyle					F	
Women's aerials		Q	F			
Women's aerials synchro					F	
Women's big air						F
Women's halfpipe	F					
Women's slopestyle					F	
Mixed team aerials				F		

== Medalists ==
=== Men ===
Event	Gold	Silver	Bronze
Aerials	Li Xinpeng; China	Yang Longxiao; China	Qi Guangpu; China
Aerials synchro	Kazakhstan; Roman Ivanov; Sherzod Khashirbayev	China; Geng Hu; Yang Yuheng	China; Li Xinpeng; Qi Guangpu
Big air	Rai Kasamura; Japan	Yoon Jong-hyun; South Korea	Shin Yeong-seop; South Korea
Halfpipe	Lee Seung-hun; South Korea	Sheng Haipeng; China	Moon Hee-sung; South Korea
Slopestyle	Rai Kasamura; Japan	Ruka Ito; Japan	Paul Vieuxtemps; Thailand

=== Women ===
Event	Gold	Silver	Bronze
Aerials	Xu Mengtao; China	Chen Xuezheng; China	Ayana Zholdas; Kazakhstan
Aerials synchro	China; Feng Junxi; Wang Xue	China; Chen Meiting; Xu Mengtao	Kazakhstan; Ardana Makhanova; Ayana Zholdas
Big air	Liu Mengting; China	Han Linshan; China	Yang Ruyi; China
Halfpipe	Li Fanghui; China	Zhang Kexin; China	Jang Yu-jin; South Korea
Slopestyle	Liu Mengting; China	Yang Ruyi; China	Han Linshan; China

=== Mixed ===
Event	Gold	Silver	Bronze
Team aerials	China; Xu Mengtao; Li Xinpeng; Qi Guangpu	Kazakhstan; Ayana Zholdas; Sherzod Khashirbayev; Assylkhan Assan	Japan; Runa Igarashi; Yuta Nakagawa; Haruto Igarashi

== Medal table ==
Rank	Nation	Gold	Silver	Bronze	Total
1	China (CHN)	7	8	4	19
2	Japan (JPN)	2	1	1	4
3	South Korea (KOR)	1	1	3	5
4	Kazakhstan (KAZ)	1	1	2	4
5	Thailand (THA)	0	0	1	1
Totals (5 entries)		11	11	11	33

== Participating nations ==
A total of 51 athletes from 8 nations competed in freestyle skiing at the 2025 Asian Winter Games:

- China (19)
- Japan (9)
- Kazakhstan (7)
- Kuwait (1)
- Philippines (1)
- South Korea (11)
- Thailand (1)
- United Arab Emirates (2)
