= Snowboarding at the 2025 Asian Winter Games =

- Venue: Yabuli Ski Resort
- Dates: 8–13 February 2025
- Competitors: 47 from 9 nations

Snowboarding competitions at the 2025 Asian Winter Games in Harbin, China, were held at Yabuli Ski Resort between 8 and 13 February 2025. The Men's/Women's halfpipe finals were both scheduled to be held on 13 February, but were cancelled due to heavy wind. The results of the snowboarding halfpipe qualification held on 12 February was taken as final results.

== Schedule ==
Q	Qualification	F	Final

Event↓/Date →	8th Sat		9th Sun	10th Mon	11th Tue	12th Wed	13th Thu
Men's big air				F			
Men's halfpipe						Q	F
Men's slopestyle	Q	F					
Women's big air				F			
Women's halfpipe						Q	F
Women's slopestyle	F						

== Medalists ==
=== Men ===
Event	Gold	Silver	Bronze
Big air	Yang Wenlong; China	Jiang Xinjie; China	Kang Dong-hun; South Korea
Halfpipe	Kim Geon-hui; South Korea	Koyata Kikuchihara; Japan	Lee Ji-o; South Korea
Slopestyle	Lee Chae-un; South Korea	Liu Haoyu; China	Kang Dong-hun; South Korea

=== Women ===
Event	Gold	Silver	Bronze
Big air	Xiong Shirui; China	Zhang Xiaonan; China	Suzuka Ishimoto; Japan
Halfpipe	Sara Shimizu; Japan	Sena Tomita; Japan	Wu Shaotong; China
Slopestyle	Zhang Xiaonan; China	Xiong Shirui; China	Himari Ishii; Japan

== Medal table ==
Rank	Nation	Gold	Silver	Bronze	Total
1	China (CHN)	3	4	1	8
2	South Korea (KOR)	2	0	3	5
3	Japan (JPN)	1	2	2	5
Totals (3 entries)		6	6	6	18

== Participating nations ==
A total of 47 athletes from 9 nations competed in snowboarding at the 2025 Asian Winter Games:

- Afghanistan (3)
- Cambodia (4)
- China (12)
- Japan (10)
- Lebanon (4)
- Qatar (1)
- South Korea (10)
- Thailand (1)
- United Arab Emirates (2)
