= 2025 Asian Winter Games medal table =

2025 Asian Winter Games medals
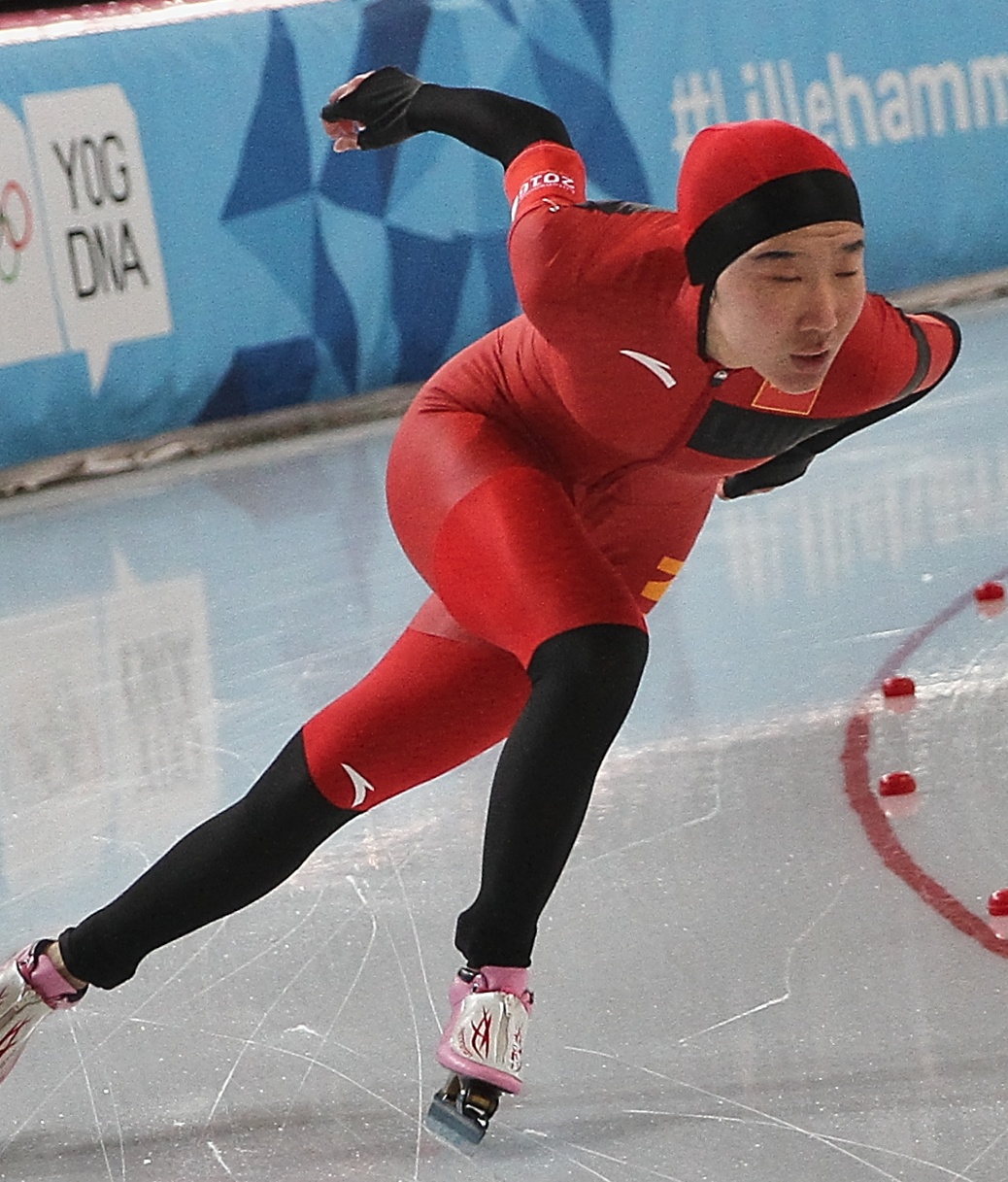
- Han Mei of China (pictured in 2016) tied for the most gold medals and won the most overall medals at the 2025 Asian Winter Games, winning three and five respectively in women's speed skating.
- Location: Harbin, China

Highlights
- Most gold medals: China (32)
- Most total medals: China (85)
- Medaling NOCs: 9

The 2025 Asian Winter Games, officially known as the 9th Asian Winter Games, were an international multi-sport event held in Harbin, China, from 7 to 14 February 2025, with preliminary events in ice hockey beginning on 4 February. A total of 1,275 athletes representing 34 National Olympic Committees (NOCs) participated, surpassing the previous record high of 32 NOCs competing at one edition in the previous games in Sapporo, Japan. Bhutan, Cambodia, and Saudi Arabia made their Asian Winter Games debut. The games featured 64 events in 11 sports, with ski mountaineering making its debut while ski jumping was removed.

Overall, athletes representing 9 NOCs won at least one medal, breaking the record of eight held by the 2011 games, and 6 NOCs won at least one gold medal. Host nation China won the most gold and the most overall medals, with 32 and 85 respectively. The Philippines' team obtained their first Asian Winter Games gold medal, which was also their first Asian Winter Games medal of any color, with curlers Benjo Delarmente, Alan Frei, Christian Haller, Enrico Pfister, and Marc Pfister winning the men's tournament. Chinese Taipei's and Thailand's teams also obtained their first Asian Winter Games medals, with the former winning bronze in the women's 100 metres speed skating event from speed skater Chen Ying-chu, and the latter also winning bronze but in the men's slopestyle event from freestyle skier Paul Vieuxtemps.

Short-track speed skater Choi Min-jeong of South Korea and speed skaters Gao Tingyu, Han Mei, and Ning Zhongyan, all three representing China, tied for the most gold medals won by an individual at the games, with three each. Han also won the most overall medals by an individual at the games, with two additional silver medals for a total of five. China achieved eleven podium sweeps, with the women's sprint classical and women's 5 kilometre freestyle in cross-country skiing, men's aerials, women's big air, and women's slopestyle in freestyle skiing, all three events in ski mountaineering, and the men's 5000 metres, women's 1500 metres, and women's 3000 metres in speed skating. South Korea also achieved a podium sweep after winning all of the medals in the women's 500 metres in short-track speed skating.

== Medal table ==
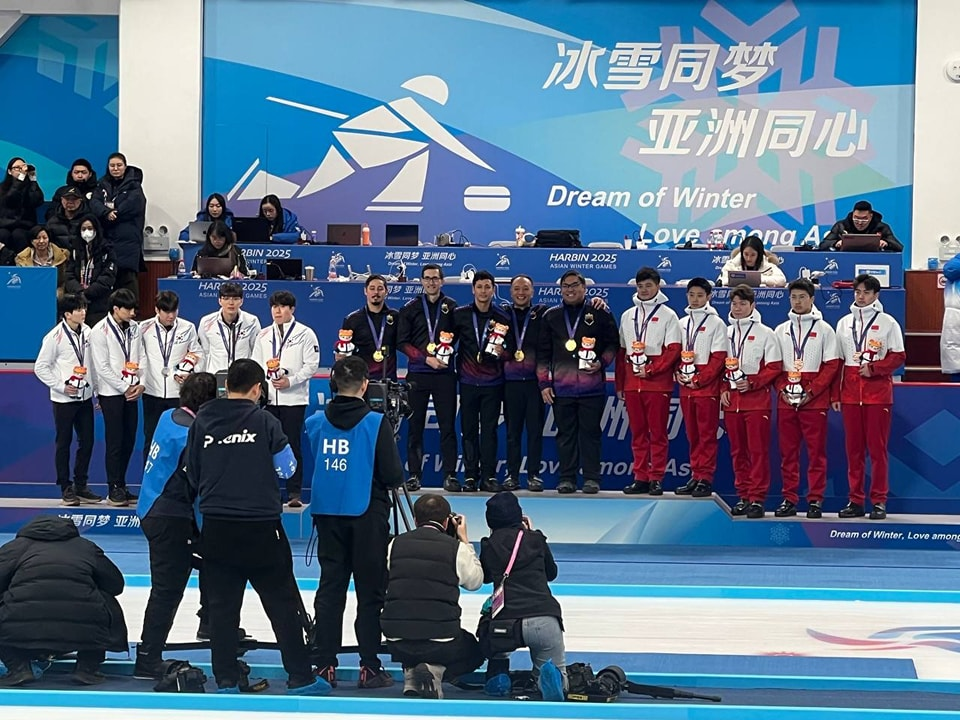
From left to right: The men's curling teams of South Korea, the Philippines, and China won silver, gold, and bronze respectively during the men's curling tournament.

The medal table is based on information provided by the Olympic Council of Asia and is consistent with conventional International Olympic Committee sorting in its published medal tables. The table uses the Olympic medal table sorting method. By default, the table is ordered by the number of gold medals the athletes from a nation have won, where a nation is an entity represented by a NOC. The number of silver medals is taken into consideration next and then the number of bronze medals. If teams are still tied, equal ranking is given and they are listed alphabetically.

* Host nation (China)

2025 Asian Winter Games medal table
Rank	Nation	Gold	Silver	Bronze	Total
1	China*	32	27	26	85
2	South Korea	16	15	14	45
3	Japan	10	12	15	37
4	Kazakhstan	4	9	7	20
5	Philippines	1	0	0	1
5	Uzbekistan	1	0	0	1
7	North Korea	0	1	0	1
8	Chinese Taipei	0	0	1	1
8	Thailand	0	0	1	1
Totals (9 entries)		64	64	64	192
