= List of Chinese records in speed skating =

The following are the national records in speed skating in China maintained by the Chinese Skating Association.

== Men ==
Event	Record	Athlete	Date	Meet	Place	Ref
500 meters	33.83	Gao Tingyu	26 September 2021		Ürümqi, China	
500 meters × 2	69.42	Yu Fengtong	9 March 2007	World Single Distance Championships	Salt Lake City, United States	
1000 meters	1:06.47	Ning Zhongyan	14 November 2025	World Cup	Salt Lake City, United States	
1500 meters	1:41.02	Ning Zhongyan	15 November 2025	World Cup	Salt Lake City, United States	
3000 meters	3:43.94	Muhamaiti Hanahati	20 October 2023		Heerenveen, Netherlands	
5000 meters	6:08.36	Liu Hanbin	21 November 2025	World Cup	Calgary, Canada	
10000 meters	12:59.30	Liu Hanbin	25 January 2025	World Cup	Calgary, Canada	
Team sprint (3 laps)	1:17.32	Deng Zhihan; Du Haonan; Ning Zhongyan	15 February 2024	World Single Distances Championships	Calgary, Canada	
Team pursuit (8 laps)	3:36.65	Liu Hanbin; Wu Yu; Ning Zhongyan	16 November 2025	World Cup	Salt Lake City, United States	
Sprint combination	136.680 pts	Ning Zhongyan	7–8 March 2024	World Sprint Championships	Inzell, Germany	
Small combination	153.828 pts	Sun Longjiang	12–13 March 2010	World Junior Championships	Moscow, Russia	
Big combination	156.393 pts	Sun Longjiang	5–6 January 2012	National Winter Games of China	Changchun, China	

== Women ==
Event	Record	Athlete	Date	Meet	Place	Ref
500 meters	36.56	Zhang Hong	20 November 2015	World Cup	Salt Lake City, United States	
500 meters × 2	74.53	Wang Beixing	10 March 2007	World Single Distance Championships	Salt Lake City, United States	
1000 meters	1:12.65	Zhang Hong	14 November 2015	World Cup	Calgary, Canada	
1500 meters	1:52.69	Han Mei	22 November 2025	World Cup	Calgary, Canada	
3000 meters	3:58.76	Han Mei	3 December 2021	World Cup	Salt Lake City, United States	
5000 meters	6:54.13	Yang Binyu	5 December 2025	World Cup	Heerenveen, Netherlands	
10000 meters						
Team sprint (3 laps)	1:24.65	Li Qishi; Yu Jing; Zhang Hong	22 November 2015	World Cup	Salt Lake City, United States	
Team pursuit (6 laps)	2:56.23	Hao Jiachen; Han Mei; Li Dan	8 December 2017	World Cup	Salt Lake City, United States	
Team pursuit (6 laps)	2:56.23	Han Mei; Hou Jundan; Li Jiaxuan	23 November 2025	World Cup	Calgary, Canada	
Sprint combination	148.280 pts	Yu Jing	26–27 January 2013	World Sprint Championships	Salt Lake City, United States	
Mini combination	163.361 pts	Gao Yang	15–17 November 2002	World Cup	Erfurt, Germany	
Small combination	159.026 pts	Han Mei	9–10 March 2024	World Allround Championships	Inzell, Germany	

== Mixed ==
Event	Record	Athlete	Date	Meet	Place	Ref
Relay	2:54.90	Sun Chuanyi; Jin Wenjing	28 January 2024	World Cup	Salt Lake City, United States	
