= Cross-country skiing at the 2025 Asian Winter Games – Women's 5 kilometre freestyle =

Women's 5 kilometre freestyle at the 2025 Asian Winter Games
- Venue: Yabuli Ski Resort
- Dates: 9 February 2025
- Competitors: 33 from 11 nations

Medalists
gold medal	Bayani Jialin	China
silver medal	Dinigeer Yilamujiang	China
bronze medal	Chi Chunxue	China

The women's 5 kilometre freestyle at the 2025 Asian Winter Games was held on 9 February 2025 at Yabuli Ski Resort in Harbin, China.

== Schedule ==
All times are China Standard Time (UTC+08:00)

Date	Time	Event
Sunday, 9 February 2025	11:00	Final

== Results ==
Rank	Athlete	Time
1st place, gold medalist(s)	Bayani Jialin (CHN)	12:07.5
2nd place, silver medalist(s)	Dinigeer Yilamujiang (CHN)	12:11.1
3rd place, bronze medalist(s)	Chi Chunxue (CHN)	12:17.5
4	Chen Lingshuang (CHN)	12:24.6
5	Nadezhda Stepashkina (KAZ)	12:25.6
6	Chika Kobayashi (JPN)	12:33.1
7	Xeniya Shalygina (KAZ)	12:45.7
8	Angelina Shuryga (KAZ)	12:54.9
9	Darya Ryazhko (KAZ)	13:03.5
10	Yuka Yamazaki (JPN)	13:06.2
11	Han Da-som (KOR)	13:15.5
12	Lee Eui-jin (KOR)	13:16.9
13	Enkhbayaryn Ariuntungalag (MGL)	13:38.1
14	Karen Hatakeyama (JPN)	13:42.6
15	Je Sang-mi (KOR)	13:44.2
16	Lee Ji-ye (KOR)	13:47.2
17	Mayu Yamamoto (JPN)	13:48.9
18	Tömöriin Ariunbold (MGL)	13:51.1
19	Samaneh Beyrami Baher (IRI)	14:20.0
20	Barsnyamyn Nomin-Erdene (MGL)	14:32.8
21	Ariunsanaagiin Enkhtuul (MGL)	14:34.6
22	Sahel Tir (IRI)	15:58.5
23	Atefeh Salehi (IRI)	16:01.7
24	Farnoush Shemshaki (IRI)	17:10.3
25	T. N. Bhavani (IND)	18:10.4
26	Antonina Borisenko (KGZ)	18:12.8
27	Phatcharapha Sangchan (THA)	18:20.2
28	Diana Taalaibekova (KGZ)	18:49.9
29	Natthaatcha Chatthitimetee (THA)	18:57.4
30	Syrelle Lozom (LBN)	20:37.3
31	Caren Succar (LBN)	21:56.4
32	Madina Saralaeva (KGZ)	22:17.1
33	Piumi Piyadarshani (SRI)	34:00.8
