= Alpine skiing at the 2025 Asian Winter Games – Women's slalom =

Women's slalom at the 2025 Asian Winter Games
- Venue: Yabuli Ski Resort
- Dates: 8 February 2025
- Competitors: 45 from 17 nations

Medalists
| gold medal | Chisaki Maeda | Japan |
| silver medal | Gim So-hui | South Korea |
| bronze medal | Eren Watanabe | Japan |

The women's slalom at the 2025 Asian Winter Games was held on 8 February 2025 at Yabuli Ski Resort, near Harbin in China.

== Schedule ==
All times are China Standard Time (UTC+08:00)

| Date | Time | Event |
|---|---|---|
| Saturday, 8 February 2025 | 10:00 | Run 1 |
| Saturday, 8 February 2025 | 12:00 | Run 2 |

== Results ==
Legend

- DNF — Did not finish
- DSQ — Disqualified

| Rank | Athlete | Run 1 | Run 2 | Total |
|---|---|---|---|---|
| 1st place, gold medalist(s) | Chisaki Maeda (JPN) | 47.29 | 46.21 | 1:33.50 |
| 2nd place, silver medalist(s) | Gim So-hui (KOR) | 47.85 | 46.21 | 1:34.06 |
| 3rd place, bronze medalist(s) | Eren Watanabe (JPN) | 48.00 | 46.92 | 1:34.92 |
| 4 | Aruwin Salehhuddin (MAS) | 49.12 | 47.62 | 1:36.74 |
| 5 | Maria Sakai (JPN) | 49.22 | 48.91 | 1:38.13 |
| 6 | Park Seo-yun (KOR) | 50.55 | 49.50 | 1:40.05 |
| 7 | Lee Min-seo (KOR) | 51.26 | 49.96 | 1:41.22 |
| 8 | Ni Yueming (CHN) | 51.38 | 50.50 | 1:41.88 |
| 9 | Mariya Shkabarova (KAZ) | 53.44 | 51.77 | 1:44.61 |
| 10 | Xeniya Berezhnaya (KAZ) | 54.86 | 52.55 | 1:47.41 |
| 11 | Lee Wen-yi (TPE) | 55.18 | 53.48 | 1:48.66 |
| 12 | Zhang Guiyuan (CHN) | 56.79 | 53.37 | 1:50.16 |
| 13 | Eloise King (HKG) | 55.80 | 54.69 | 1:50.49 |
| 14 | Aerin King (HKG) | 56.77 | 56.22 | 1:52.99 |
| 15 | Sabina Rejepova (UZB) | 57.28 | 55.87 | 1:53.15 |
| 16 | Tallulah Proulx (PHI) | 58.24 | 55.18 | 1:53.42 |
| 17 | Valeriya Kovaleva (UZB) | 59.86 | 56.55 | 1:56.41 |
| 18 | Isabella Kao (HKG) | 1:02.92 | 1:01.53 | 2:04.45 |
| 19 | Joud Farhoud (KSA) | 1:03.84 | 1:01.81 | 2:05.65 |
| 20 | Karyssa Vasavanont (THA) | 1:05.36 | 1:01.75 | 2:07.11 |
| 21 | Sandhya Thakur (IND) | 1:07.05 | 1:04.38 | 2:11.43 |
| 22 | Almina Ibragimova (KGZ) | 1:07.52 | 1:05.62 | 2:13.14 |
| 23 | Mariya Morozova (UZB) | 1:07.49 | 1:05.67 | 2:13.16 |
| 24 | Phichayaporn Thipkesorn (THA) | 1:08.64 | 1:06.11 | 2:14.75 |
| 25 | Aanchal Thakur (IND) | 1:10.34 | 1:06.07 | 2:16.41 |
| 26 | Samira Amatova (KGZ) | 1:11.29 | 1:06.59 | 2:17.88 |
| 27 | Altanzulyn Sondorbayar (MGL) | 1:12.14 | 1:07.83 | 2:19.97 |
| 28 | Tanuja Thakur (IND) | 1:11.92 | 1:08.37 | 2:20.29 |
| 29 | Mӧnkhbayaryn Injin (MGL) | 1:11.26 | 1:09.18 | 2:20.44 |
| 30 | Serena Jallad (LBN) | 1:11.25 | 1:09.57 | 2:20.82 |
| 31 | Amartüvshingiin Itgel (MGL) | 1:12.73 | 1:08.18 | 2:20.91 |
| 32 | Haya Al-Rifai (LBN) | 1:13.34 | 1:10.96 | 2:24.30 |
| 33 | Khüderchuluuny Khaliun (MGL) | 1:15.93 | 1:11.42 | 2:27.35 |
| 34 | Debora Timalsina (NEP) | 1:34.46 | 1:32.60 | 3:07.06 |
| 35 | Laxmi Rai (NEP) | 1:38.91 | 1:43.22 | 3:22.13 |
| — | Alexandra Skorokhodova (KAZ) | 48.44 | DNF | DNF |
| — | Maryam Kiashemshaki (IRI) | 58.37 | DNF | DNF |
| — | Arina Shabanova (KGZ) | 1:11.82 | DNF | DNF |
| — | Alexandra Troitskaya (KAZ) | 55.23 | DSQ | DSQ |
| — | Ding Jie (CHN) | 55.43 | DSQ | DSQ |
| — | Kseniya Grigoreva (UZB) | 56.92 | DSQ | DSQ |
| — | Choi Tae-hee (KOR) | DNF | | DNF |
| — | Sharifa Al-Sudairi (KSA) | DNF | | DNF |
| — | Zhang Yuying (CHN) | DSQ | | DSQ |
| — | Samantha Zhong (HKG) | DSQ | | DSQ |
