= Freestyle skiing at the 2025 Asian Winter Games – Women's halfpipe =

Women's halfpipe at the 2025 Asian Winter Games
- Venue: Yabuli Ski Resort
- Dates: 8 February 2025
- Competitors: 6 from 2 nations

Medalists
gold medal	Li Fanghui	China
silver medal	Zhang Kexin	China
bronze medal	Jang Yu-jin	South Korea

The women's halfpipe at the 2025 Asian Winter Games was held on 8 February 2025 at Yabuli Ski Resort in Harbin, China.

== Schedule ==
All times are China Standard Time (UTC+08:00)

Date	Time	Event
Saturday, 8 February 2025	10:00	Final

== Results ==
Legend

- DNI — Did not improve

Rank	Athlete	Run 1	Run 2	Run 3	Best
1st place, gold medalist(s)	Li Fanghui (CHN)	93.00	DNI	95.25	95.25
2nd place, silver medalist(s)	Zhang Kexin (CHN)	87.50	89.25	DNI	89.25
3rd place, bronze medalist(s)	Jang Yu-jin (KOR)	80.75	83.75	85.00	85.00
4	Shin Hye-rin (KOR)	69.50	71.00	72.00	72.00
5	Lee So-young (KOR)	62.25	63.00	DNI	63.00
6	Lim Yeon-ju (KOR)	58.25	59.50	DNI	59.50
