= Cross-country skiing at the 2025 Asian Winter Games – Women's sprint classical =

Women's sprint classical at the 2025 Asian Winter Games
- Venue: Yabuli Ski Resort
- Dates: 8 February 2025
- Competitors: 28 from 10 nations

Medalists
gold medal	Li Lei	China
silver medal	Meng Honglian	China
bronze medal	Dinigeer Yilamujiang	China

The women's sprint classical at the 2025 Asian Winter Games was held on 8 February 2025 at Yabuli Ski Resort in Harbin, China.

== Schedule ==
All times are China Standard Time (UTC+08:00)

Date	Time	Event
Saturday, 8 February 2025	11:00	Qualification
Saturday, 8 February 2025	13:00	Quarterfinals
Saturday, 8 February 2025	14:10	Semifinals
Saturday, 8 February 2025	14:40	Final

== Results ==
Legend

- DNF — Did not finish
- DNS — Did not start
- DSQ — Disqualified

=== Qualification ===
Rank	Athlete	Time
1	Meng Honglian (CHN)	3:31.39
2	Chen Lingshuang (CHN)	3:35.15
3	Darya Ryazhko (KAZ)	3:39.72
4	Nadezhda Stepashkina (KAZ)	3:40.50
5	Dinigeer Yilamujiang (CHN)	3:40.64
6	Chika Kobayashi (JPN)	3:44.05
7	Xeniya Shalygina (KAZ)	3:44.90
8	Enkhbayaryn Ariuntungalag (MGL)	3:48.76
9	Li Lei (CHN)	3:50.38
10	Yuka Yamazaki (JPN)	3:53.76
11	Mariya Lyuft (KAZ)	3:55.84
12	Lee Eui-jin (KOR)	3:58.36
13	Han Da-som (KOR)	4:02.71
14	Tömöriin Ariunbold (MGL)	4:04.82
15	Barsnyamyn Nomin-Erdene (MGL)	4:05.33
16	Mayu Yamamoto (JPN)	4:05.72
17	Lee Ji-ye (KOR)	4:14.68
18	Samaneh Beyrami Baher (IRI)	4:15.77
19	Naranbatyn Nandintsetseg (MGL)	4:33.13
20	Sahel Tir (IRI)	4:45.03
21	Atefeh Salehi (IRI)	5:04.50
22	Farnoush Shemshaki (IRI)	5:13.75
23	Natthaatcha Chatthitimetee (THA)	5:17.59
24	T. N. Bhavani (IND)	5:34.69
25	Phatcharapha Sangchan (THA)	5:37.36
26	Syrelle Lozom (LBN)	5:50.89
27	Diana Taalaibekova (KGZ)	6:00.20
—	Caren Succar (LBN)	DNS

=== Quarterfinals ===
- Qualification: First 2 in each heat (Q) and the next 2 fastest lucky loser (LL) advance to the semifinals.

==== Heat 1 ====
Rank	Athlete	Time	Notes
1	Meng Honglian (CHN)	3:34.86	Q
2	Mariya Lyuft (KAZ)	3:41.33	Q
3	Yuka Yamazaki (JPN)	3:41.56	LL
4	Sahel Tir (IRI)	4:46.04	
5	Atefeh Salehi (IRI)	4:56.67	

==== Heat 2 ====
Rank	Athlete	Time	Notes
1	Xeniya Shalygina (KAZ)	3:48.36	Q
2	Nadezhda Stepashkina (KAZ)	3:48.89	Q
3	Tömöriin Ariunbold (MGL)	3:50.85	LL
4	Lee Ji-ye (KOR)	4:06.80	
5	T. N. Bhavani (IND)	5:34.64	
6	Diana Taalaibekova (KGZ)	5:45.07	

==== Heat 3 ====
Rank	Athlete	Time	Notes
1	Dinigeer Yilamujiang (CHN)	3:40.05	Q
2	Chika Kobayashi (JPN)	3:43.18	Q
3	Mayu Yamamoto (JPN)	3:53.76	
4	Barsnyamyn Nomin-Erdene (MGL)	4:03.38	
5	Phatcharapha Sangchan (THA)	5:14.05	
—	Syrelle Lozom (LBN)	DNF	

==== Heat 4 ====
Rank	Athlete	Time	Notes
1	Chen Lingshuang (CHN)	3:44.35	Q
2	Li Lei (CHN)	3:45.30	Q
3	Lee Eui-jin (KOR)	3:52.65	
4	Naranbatyn Nandintsetseg (MGL)	4:21.04	
5	Farnoush Shemshaki (IRI)	5:36.46	

==== Heat 5 ====
Rank	Athlete	Time	Notes
1	Darya Ryazhko (KAZ)	3:46.99	Q
2	Enkhbayaryn Ariuntungalag (MGL)	3:49.71	Q
3	Han Da-som (KOR)	3:53.21	
4	Samaneh Beyrami Baher (IRI)	4:21.94	
5	Natthaatcha Chatthitimetee (THA)	5:51.53	

=== Semifinals ===
- Qualification: First 2 in each heat (Q) and the next 2 fastest lucky loser (LL) advance to the final.

==== Heat 1 ====
Rank	Athlete	Time	Notes
1	Meng Honglian (CHN)	3:29.12	Q
2	Dinigeer Yilamujiang (CHN)	3:29.61	Q
3	Nadezhda Stepashkina (KAZ)	3:31.44	LL
4	Mariya Lyuft (KAZ)	3:38.00	
5	Xeniya Shalygina (KAZ)	3:38.43	
6	Tömöriin Ariunbold (MGL)	4:11.70	

==== Heat 2 ====
Rank	Athlete	Time	Notes
1	Chen Lingshuang (CHN)	3:31.44	Q
2	Li Lei (CHN)	3:31.77	Q
3	Darya Ryazhko (KAZ)	3:32.56	LL
4	Chika Kobayashi (JPN)	3:36.42	
5	Enkhbayaryn Ariuntungalag (MGL)	3:49.27	
6	Yuka Yamazaki (JPN)	3:51.94	

=== Final ===
Rank	Athlete	Time
1st place, gold medalist(s)	Li Lei (CHN)	3:25.25
2nd place, silver medalist(s)	Meng Honglian (CHN)	3:25.91
3rd place, bronze medalist(s)	Dinigeer Yilamujiang (CHN)	3:28.56
4	Darya Ryazhko (KAZ)	3:34.35
5	Nadezhda Stepashkina (KAZ)	3:36.47
—	Chen Lingshuang (CHN)	DSQ
