= Speed skating at the 2025 Asian Winter Games – Men's 1000 metres =

Men's 1000 metres at the 2025 Asian Winter Games
- Venue: Heilongjiang Speed Skating Hall
- Dates: 11 February 2025
- Competitors: 23 from 9 nations

Medalists
gold medal	Ning Zhongyan	China
silver medal	Cha Min-kyu	South Korea
bronze medal	Lian Ziwen	China

The men's 1000 metres competition in speed skating at the 2025 Asian Winter Games was held on 11 February 2025 in Harbin, China.

== Schedule ==
All times are China Standard Time (UTC+08:00)

Date	Time	Event
Tuesday, 11 February 2025	12:00	Final

== Records ==
Prior to this competition, the existing world and Games records were as follows.

World Record	Jordan Stolz (USA)	1:05.37	Salt Lake City, United States	26 January 2024
Games Record	Takuro Oda (JPN)	1:09.33	Sapporo, Japan	21 February 2017

== Results ==
Rank	Pair	Athlete	Time	Notes
1st place, gold medalist(s)	12	Ning Zhongyan (CHN)	1:08.81	GR
2nd place, silver medalist(s)	10	Cha Min-kyu (KOR)	1:09.63	
3rd place, bronze medalist(s)	10	Lian Ziwen (CHN)	1:09.68	
4	12	Ryota Kojima (JPN)	1:09.70	
5	11	Kazuya Yamada (JPN)	1:09.96	
6	7	Koo Kyung-min (KOR)	1:10.13	
7	8	Cho Sang-hyeok (KOR)	1:10.36	
8	4	Oh Hyun-min (KOR)	1:10.69	
9	6	Altay Zhardembekuly (KAZ)	1:10.90	
10	11	Masaya Yamada (JPN)	1:11.16	
11	5	Roman Binazarov (KAZ)	1:11.58	
12	9	Du Haonan (CHN)	1:11.62	
13	9	Tai Wei-lin (TPE)	1:11.64	
14	8	Artur Galiyev (KAZ)	1:11.78	
15	7	Yamato Matsui (JPN)	1:12.61	
16	5	Nikita Vazhenin (KAZ)	1:15.00	
17	4	Chandra Mouli Danda (IND)	1:18.40	
18	6	Sidney Chu (HKG)	1:19.38	
19	1	Srivatsa Srikantha Rao (IND)	1:21.86	
20	2	Omkara Yogaraj (IND)	1:24.64	
21	2	Daniel Concessao (IND)	1:25.35	
22	3	Bekhbatyn Tögöldör (MGL)	1:28.18	
23	3	Nopphaket Suansuk (THA)	1:31.48	
