= Freestyle skiing at the 2025 Asian Winter Games – Women's big air =

Women's big air at the 2025 Asian Winter Games
- Venue: Yabuli Ski Resort
- Dates: 12 February 2025
- Competitors: 6 from 3 nations

Medalists
gold medal	Liu Mengting	China
silver medal	Han Linshan	China
bronze medal	Yang Ruyi	China

The women's big air at the 2025 Asian Winter Games was held on 12 February 2025 at Yabuli Ski Resort in Harbin, China.

The event was originally scheduled to take place on 13 February but after discussions at the team leaders' meeting, jury members agreed to hold the event a day early due to weather conditions.

== Schedule ==
All times are China Standard Time (UTC+08:00)

Date	Time	Event
Wednesday, 12 February 2025	10:10	Final

== Results ==
Legend

- DNI — Did not improve

Rank	Athlete	Run 1	Run 2	Run 3	Total
1st place, gold medalist(s)	Liu Mengting (CHN)	91.75	83.75	~~DNI~~	175.50
2nd place, silver medalist(s)	Han Linshan (CHN)	83.00	79.75	~~DNI~~	162.75
3rd place, bronze medalist(s)	Yang Ruyi (CHN)	~~80.50~~	76.75	82.75	159.50
4	Kiho Sugawara (JPN)	75.75	79.00	~~DNI~~	154.75
5	Kanon Kondo (JPN)	68.00	66.75	~~DNI~~	134.75
6	Amihan Rabe (PHI)	64.00	55.50	~~DNI~~	119.50
