= Freestyle skiing at the 2025 Asian Winter Games – Women's slopestyle =

Women's slopestyle at the 2025 Asian Winter Games
- Venue: Yabuli Ski Resort
- Dates: 11 February 2025
- Competitors: 6 from 3 nations

Medalists
gold medal	Liu Mengting	China
silver medal	Yang Ruyi	China
bronze medal	Han Linshan	China

The women's slopestyle at the 2025 Asian Winter Games was held on 11 February 2025 at Yabuli Ski Resort in Harbin, China.

== Schedule ==
All times are China Standard Time (UTC+08:00)

Date	Time	Event
Tuesday, 11 February 2025	11:00	Final

== Results ==
Legend

- DNI — Did not improve

Rank	Athlete	Run 1	Run 2	Run 3	Best
1st place, gold medalist(s)	Liu Mengting (CHN)	94.00	DNI	DNI	94.00
2nd place, silver medalist(s)	Yang Ruyi (CHN)	45.00	90.50	DNI	90.50
3rd place, bronze medalist(s)	Han Linshan (CHN)	87.00	DNI	DNI	87.00
4	Kiho Sugawara (JPN)	75.50	81.75	DNI	81.75
5	Kanon Kondo (JPN)	70.00	72.00	DNI	72.00
6	Amihan Rabe (PHI)	56.50	DNI	DNI	56.50
