= Snowboarding at the 2025 Asian Winter Games – Women's big air =

Women's big air at the 2025 Asian Winter Games
- Venue: Yabuli Ski Resort
- Dates: 10 February 2025
- Competitors: 7 from 4 nations

Medalists
gold medal	Xiong Shirui	China
silver medal	Zhang Xiaonan	China
bronze medal	Suzuka Ishimoto	Japan

The women's big air at the 2025 Asian Winter Games was held on 10 February 2025 at Yabuli Ski Resort in Harbin, China.

== Schedule ==
All times are China Standard Time (UTC+08:00)

Date	Time	Event
Monday, 10 February 2025	11:00	Final

== Results ==
Legend

- DNI — Did not improve
- DNS — Did not start

Rank	Athlete	Run 1	Run 2	Run 3	Total
1st place, gold medalist(s)	Xiong Shirui (CHN)	75.75	88.25	~~DNI~~	164.00
2nd place, silver medalist(s)	Zhang Xiaonan (CHN)	78.00	78.75	~~DNI~~	156.75
3rd place, bronze medalist(s)	Suzuka Ishimoto (JPN)	72.75	~~43.25~~	61.75	134.50
4	Yu Seung-eun (KOR)	70.75	48.50	~~DNS~~	119.25
5	Choi Seo-woo (KOR)	~~31.00~~	40.00	45.25	85.25
6	Lynn Abi Nader (LBN)	~~15.00~~	24.75	~~DNI~~	24.75
—	Kiara Morii (JPN)				DNS
