= Speed skating at the 2025 Asian Winter Games – Women's 1000 metres =

Women's 1000 metres at the 2025 Asian Winter Games
- Venue: Heilongjiang Speed Skating Hall
- Dates: 11 February 2025
- Competitors: 20 from 7 nations

Medalists
| gold medal | Han Mei | China |
| silver medal | Yin Qi | China |
| bronze medal | Lee Na-hyun | South Korea |

The Women's 1000 metres competition in speed skating at the 2025 Asian Winter Games was held on 11 February 2025 in Harbin, China.

== Schedule ==
All times are China Standard Time (UTC+08:00)

| Date | Time | Event |
|---|---|---|
| Tuesday, 11 February 2025 | 13:15 | Final |

== Records ==
Prior to this competition, the existing world and Games records were as follows.

| World Record | Brittany Bowe (USA) | 1:11.61 | Salt Lake City, United States | 9 March 2019 |
| Games Record | Nao Kodaira (JPN) | 1:15.19 | Sapporo, Japan | 20 February 2017 |

== Results ==
| Rank | Pair | Athlete | Time | Notes |
|---|---|---|---|---|
| 1st place, gold medalist(s) | 8 | Han Mei (CHN) | 1:15.85 | |
| 2nd place, silver medalist(s) | 9 | Yin Qi (CHN) | 1:16.08 | |
| 3rd place, bronze medalist(s) | 7 | Lee Na-hyun (KOR) | 1:16.39 | |
| 4 | 8 | Kim Min-sun (KOR) | 1:16.74 | |
| 5 | 9 | Rio Yamada (JPN) | 1:16.88 | |
| 6 | 10 | Kang Soo-min (KOR) | 1:17.90 | |
| 7 | 10 | Nadezhda Morozova (KAZ) | 1:17.96 | |
| 8 | 6 | Rin Kosaka (JPN) | 1:18.07 | |
| 9 | 7 | Anna Kubo (JPN) | 1:18.75 | |
| 10 | 2 | Darya Vazhenina (KAZ) | 1:19.01 | |
| 11 | 3 | Xu Meng (CHN) | 1:19.50 | |
| 12 | 5 | Chen Ying-chu (TPE) | 1:19.74 | |
| 13 | 5 | Kako Yamane (JPN) | 1:19.76 | |
| 14 | 3 | Inessa Shumekova (KAZ) | 1:19.79 | |
| 15 | 6 | Kim Kyoung-ju (KOR) | 1:19.93 | |
| 16 | 4 | Arina Ilyachshenko (KAZ) | 1:22.49 | |
| 17 | 2 | Yu Shihui (CHN) | 1:23.92 | |
| 18 | 4 | Shruti Kotwal (IND) | 1:28.59 | |
| 19 | 1 | Nicole Law (HKG) | 1:37.38 | |
| 20 | 1 | Diya Harsha Rao (IND) | 1:49.59 | |
