= Snowboarding at the 2025 Asian Winter Games – Men's slopestyle =

Men's slopestyle at the 2025 Asian Winter Games
- Venue: Yabuli Ski Resort
- Dates: 8 February 2025
- Competitors: 18 from 9 nations

Medalists
gold medal	Lee Chae-un	South Korea
silver medal	Liu Haoyu	China
bronze medal	Kang Dong-hun	South Korea

The men's slopestyle at the 2025 Asian Winter Games was held on 8 February 2025 at Yabuli Ski Resort in Harbin, China.

== Schedule ==
All times are China Standard Time (UTC+08:00)

Date	Time	Event
Saturday, 8 February 2025	08:45	Qualification
Saturday, 8 February 2025	13:30	Final

== Results ==
Legend

- DNF — Did not finish
- DNI — Did not improve
- DNS — Did not start

=== Qualification ===
Rank	Athlete	Run 1	Run 2	Best
1	Yang Wenlong (CHN)	78.50	93.25	93.25
2	Lee Chae-un (KOR)	84.00	89.50	89.50
3	Jiang Xinjie (CHN)	59.00	77.25	77.25
4	Hanato Minamiya (JPN)	72.25	DNI	72.25
5	Kang Dong-hun (KOR)	60.50	DNI	60.50
6	Ge Chunyu (CHN)	28.75	57.00	57.00
7	Lubpawath Chayametisurat (THA)	20.25	44.00	44.00
8	Liu Haoyu (CHN)	37.75	DNI	37.75
9	Humaid Al-Ansari (UAE)	23.50	DNI	23.50
10	Ahmad Mushtaba Habibzi (AFG)	8.50	12.00	12.00
11	Pisey Panhasith (CAM)	5.50	7.75	7.75
12	Mohammed Khalid Al-Kuwari (QAT)	3.00	5.25	5.25
13	Phin Mengchoing (CAM)	1.75	2.50	2.50
14	Doung Chantsovanratanak (CAM)	1.25	2.00	2.00
—	Ry Bunhak (CAM)	DNF	DNF	DNF
—	Lee Dong-heon (KOR)			DNS
—	Jad Tawk (LBN)			DNS
—	Mickel Ferando (LBN)			DNS

=== Final ===
Rank	Athlete	Run 1	Run 2	Run 3	Best
1st place, gold medalist(s)	Lee Chae-un (KOR)	81.25	DNI	90.00	90.00
2nd place, silver medalist(s)	Liu Haoyu (CHN)	50.00	DNI	76.00	76.00
3rd place, bronze medalist(s)	Kang Dong-hun (KOR)	31.00	57.50	74.00	74.00
4	Jiang Xinjie (CHN)	70.50	DNI	DNI	70.50
5	Hanato Minamiya (JPN)	13.75	70.00	DNI	70.00
6	Yang Wenlong (CHN)	67.25	DNI	DNI	67.25
7	Ge Chunyu (CHN)	59.00	DNI	DNI	59.00
—	Lubpawath Chayametisurat (THA)				DNS
