= Lebanon at the 2025 Asian Winter Games =

- Flag of Lebanon
- IOC code: LBN
- NOC: Lebanese Olympic Committee

in Harbin, China 7 February 2025 – 14 February 2025
- Competitors: 17 in 5 sports
- Flag bearers: Maurizio Sottile & Joanne Diwan
- Medals: Gold 0 Silver 0 Bronze 0 Total 0

Asian Winter Games appearances
- 1996; 1999; 2003; 2007; 2011; 2017; 2025; 2029

Lebanon competed at the 2025 Asian Winter Games in Harbin, China, from February 7 to 14. The Lebanese team consisted of 17 athletes competing in five sports. The 17 athletes represented the largest team the country sent to the Asian Winter Games. Originally, cross-country skier Samer Tawk and alpine skier Serena Jallad were scheduled to be the country's flagbearers during the opening ceremony. However, only two officials (Maurizio Sottile and Joanne Diwan) paraded in for the country and carried the flag.

== Competitors ==
The following table lists the Lebanese delegation per sport and gender.

Sport	Men	Women	Total
Alpine skiing	2	2	4
Biathlon	2	2	4
Cross-country skiing	2	2	4
Ski mountaineering	1	0	1
Snowboarding	2	2	4
Total	9	8	17

== Alpine skiing ==
Lebanon entered four alpine skiers (two men and two women).

Athlete	Event	Run 1		Run 2		Total	
Athlete	Event	Time	Rank	Time	Rank	Time	Rank
Anthony Mrad	Men's slalom	1:04.34	41	1:03.09	33	2:07.43	34
Ziad Shehab	Men's slalom	Did not finish					
Haya Al Rifai	Women's slalom	1:13.34	38	1:10.96	32	2:24.30	32
Serena Jallad	Women's slalom	1:11.25	31	1:09.57	31	2:20.82	30

== Biathlon ==
Lebanon entered four biathletes (two per gender).

Athlete	Event	Time	Misses	Rank
Paul Kayrouz	Men's sprint	47:10.5	4+5	29
Elie Tawk	Men's sprint	45:15.2	3+3	28
Glory Al-Fakhry	Women's sprint	41:56.8	2+4	24
Jeanne Tawk	Women's sprint	43:46.0	3+4	25

== Cross-country skiing ==
Lebanon entered four cross-country skiers (two men and two women).

Distance

Athlete	Event	Final		
Athlete	Event	Time	Deficit	Rank
Marcelino Tawk	Men's 10 km freestyle	28:22.6	+7:16.1	35
Samer Tawk	Men's 10 km freestyle	26:52.6	+5:46.1	30
Syrelle Lozom	Women's 5 km freestyle	20:37.3	+8:29.8	30
Caren Succar	Women's 5 km freestyle	21:56.4	+9:48.9	31

Sprint

Athlete	Event	Qualification		Quarterfinals		Semifinals		Final	
Athlete	Event	Time	Rank	Time	Rank	Time	Rank	Time	Rank
Marcelino Tawk	Men's sprint classical	Did not start							
Samer Tawk	Men's sprint classical	Did not start							
Syrelle Lozom	Women's sprint classical	5:50.89	26 Q	DNF		Did not advance			26
Caren Succar	Women's sprint classical	Did not start							

== Ski mountaineering ==
Lebanon entered one male ski mountaineer.

Men

Athlete	Event	Qualification		Semifinals		Final	
Athlete	Event	Time	Rank	Time	Rank	Time	Rank
Georges Wakim	Sprint	3:51.66	15	Did not advance			

== Snowboarding ==
Lebanon entered four snowboarders (two men and two women).

Athlete	Event	Qualification				Final				
Athlete	Event	Run 1	Run 2	Best	Rank	Run 1	Run 2	Run 3	Best	Rank
Mickel Ferando	Men's slopestyle	Did not start				Did not advance				
Jad Tawk	Men's slopestyle	Did not start				Did not advance				
Lynn Abi Nader	Women's big air	DNF	DNF	DNF	—N/a	15.00	24.75	DNI	24.75	6
Jennifer Tawk	Women's slopestyle	—N/a				Did not start				
