= Snowboarding at the 2025 Asian Winter Games – Women's slopestyle =

Women's slopestyle at the 2025 Asian Winter Games
- Venue: Yabuli Ski Resort
- Dates: 8 February 2025
- Competitors: 8 from 5 nations

Medalists
| gold medal | Zhang Xiaonan | China |
| silver medal | Xiong Shirui | China |
| bronze medal | Himari Ishii | Japan |

The women's slopestyle at the 2025 Asian Winter Games was held on 8 February 2025 at Yabuli Ski Resort in Harbin, China.

== Schedule ==
All times are China Standard Time (UTC+08:00)

| Date | Time | Event |
|---|---|---|
| Saturday, 8 February 2025 | 11:05 | Final |

== Results ==
Legend

- DNI — Did not improve
- DNS — Did not start

| Rank | Athlete | Run 1 | Run 2 | Run 3 | Best |
|---|---|---|---|---|---|
| 1st place, gold medalist(s) | Zhang Xiaonan (CHN) | 80.75 | 88.75 | 95.25 | 95.25 |
| 2nd place, silver medalist(s) | Xiong Shirui (CHN) | 75.25 | DNI | DNI | 75.25 |
| 3rd place, bronze medalist(s) | Himari Ishii (JPN) | 54.75 | 61.50 | 69.50 | 69.50 |
| 4 | Suzuka Ishimoto (JPN) | 59.50 | DNI | DNI | 59.50 |
| 5 | Yu Seung-eun (KOR) | 31.00 | DNI | 58.25 | 58.25 |
| 6 | Amenah Al-Muhairi (UAE) | 26.75 | 28.25 | DNI | 28.25 |
| 7 | Choi Seo-woo (KOR) | 20.25 | DNI | DNI | 20.25 |
| — | Jennifer Tawk (LBN) | | | | DNS |
