= Snowboarding at the 2025 Asian Winter Games – Men's big air =

Men's big air at the 2025 Asian Winter Games
- Venue: Yabuli Ski Resort
- Dates: 10 February 2025
- Competitors: 8 from 4 nations

Medalists
gold medal	Yang Wenlong	China
silver medal	Jiang Xinjie	China
bronze medal	Kang Dong-hun	South Korea

The men's big air at the 2025 Asian Winter Games was held on 10 February 2025 at Yabuli Ski Resort in Harbin, China.

== Schedule ==
All times are China Standard Time (UTC+08:00)

Date	Time	Event
Monday, 10 February 2025	11:18	Final

== Results ==
Legend

- DNI — Did not improve
- DNS — Did not start

Rank	Athlete	Run 1	Run 2	Run 3	Total
1st place, gold medalist(s)	Yang Wenlong (CHN)	95.50	~~85.00~~	97.75	193.25
2nd place, silver medalist(s)	Jiang Xinjie (CHN)	83.25	77.00	~~10.50~~	160.25
3rd place, bronze medalist(s)	Kang Dong-hun (KOR)	~~77.75~~	80.25	78.50	158.75
4	Liu Haoyu (CHN)	69.75	86.75	~~DNI~~	156.50
5	Hanato Minamiya (JPN)	~~41.50~~	78.00	73.00	151.00
6	Ge Chunyu (CHN)	~~31.50~~	58.25	28.75	87.00
7	Lubpawath Chayametisurat (THA)	~~13.50~~	15.75	34.75	50.50
—	Lee Dong-heon (KOR)				DNS
