= Cambodia at the 2025 Asian Winter Games =

- Flag of Cambodia
- IOC code: CAM
- NOC: National Olympic Committee of Cambodia

in Harbin, China 7 February 2025 – 14 February 2025
- Competitors: 4 in 1 sport
- Flag bearer: Panhasith Pisey
- Medals: Gold 0 Silver 0 Bronze 0 Total 0

Asian Winter Games appearances
- 2025; 2029

Cambodia competed at the 2025 Asian Winter Games in Harbin, China, from February 7 to 14. A tropical nation, Cambodia made its Asian Winter Games debut in this edition. Snowboarder Panhasith Pisey was the country's opening ceremony flagbearer.

== Competitors ==
The following table lists the Cambodian delegation per sport and gender.

Sport	Men	Women	Total
Snowboarding	4	0	4
Total	4	0	4

== Snowboarding ==
Cambodia entered four male snowboarders. The four snowboarders trained in South Korea for only two weeks before the games began.

Men

Athlete	Event	Qualification				Final				
Athlete	Event	Run 1	Run 2	Best	Rank	Run 1	Run 2	Run 3	Best	Rank
Chantsovanratanak Doung	Slopestyle	1.25	2.00	2.00	14	Did not advance				
Mengchoing Phin	Slopestyle	1.75	2.50	2.50	13	Did not advance				
Panhasith Pisey	Slopestyle	5.50	7.75	7.75	11	Did not advance				
Bunhak Ry	Slopestyle	DNF	DNF	DNF	—N/a	Did not advance				

== See also ==
- Cambodia at the 2024 Summer Olympics
