= 2008 National Winter Games of China =

Multi-sport event in Qiqihar, China

The 11th National Winter Games of the People's Republic of China were held in Qiqihar from the 17-Jan to the 27-Jan, 2008. The snow events were held at nearby Yabuli. A total of 92 gold medals were handed out in a number of winter sports.

== Sports ==
Competitions included:

- Ice hockey
- Figure skating
- Short-track speed skating
- Curling
- Ski jumping
- Cross-country skiing
- Downhill skiing
- Freestyle skiing

== Participating units ==
This event is set up on city or district lines.
