= Freestyle skiing at the 2024 Winter Youth Olympics – Women's slopestyle =

Women's slopestyle at the IV Winter Youth Olympic Games
- Venue: Welli Hilli Park
- Dates: 24 January
- Competitors: 21 from 15 nations
- Winning points: 90.50

Medalists
1st place, gold medalist(s)		Flora Tabanelli	Italy
2nd place, silver medalist(s)		Han Linshan	China
3rd place, bronze medalist(s)		Muriel Mohr	Germany

The women's slopestyle event in freestyle skiing at the 2024 Winter Youth Olympics took place on 24 January at the Welli Hilli Park.

== Qualification ==
The qualification was started at 09:45.

Rank	Bib	Name	Country	Run 1	Run 2	Best	Notes
1	1	Flora Tabanelli	Italy	91.00	55.75	91.00	Q
2	2	Muriel Mohr	Germany	84.25	86.75	86.75	Q
3	10	Eleanor Andrews	United States	79.25	9.25	79.25	Q
4	3	Mischa Thomas	New Zealand	70.50	77.75	77.75	Q
5	7	Kathryn Gray	United States	76.00	75.75	76.00	Q
6	6	Daisy Thomas	Australia	69.00	53.50	69.00	Q
7	5	Han Linshan	China	68.00	67.25	68.00	Q
8	4	Madeleine Disbrowe	New Zealand	65.25	63.25	65.25	Q
9	15	Siyu Xiao	China	60.75	62.25	62.25	Q
10	22	Ella Garrod	Canada	57.75	56.25	57.75	Q
11	12	Honey Smith	France	17.50	55.25	55.25	
12	14	Kiho Sugawara	Japan	53.50	50.50	53.50	
13	16	Mirjam Revjagin	Estonia	45.75	11.25	45.75	
14	21	Gabrielle Dinn	Canada	16.50	42.00	42.00	
15	18	Ugne Paulaviciute	Lithuania	7.25	34.25	34.25	
16	17	Lucinda Laird	Australia	33.00	18.50	33.00	
17	8	Lina Häggström	Finland	23.50	DNS	23.50	
18	13	Mariia Aniichyn	Ukraine	5.25	19.75	19.75	
19	9	Olga Stafylidou	Greece	1.00	DNS	1.00	
20	20	Laetaz Amihan Rabe	Philippines	DNS			
21	11	Nataliia Kaziuk	Ukraine	DNS			

== Final ==
The final was started at 12:30.

Rank	Bib	Name	Country	Run 1	Run 2	Run 3	Total
1st place, gold medalist(s)	1	Flora Tabanelli	Italy	25.00	74.75	90.50	90.50
2nd place, silver medalist(s)	5	Han Linshan	China	70.25	10.75	81.50	81.50
3rd place, bronze medalist(s)	2	Muriel Mohr	Germany	78.75	61.00	70.50	78.75
4	15	Siyu Xiao	China	38.75	3.00	68.50	68.50
5	6	Daisy Thomas	Australia	64.75	67.25	62.25	67.25
6	7	Kathryn Gray	United States	60.00	49.25	63.75	63.75
7	22	Ella Garrod	Canada	45.25	56.50	39.50	56.50
8	10	Eleanor Andrews	United States	53.50	32.50	43.25	53.50
9	4	Madeleine Disbrowe	New Zealand	34.75	43.50	14.00	43.50
10	3	Mischa Thomas	New Zealand	DNS			
