= Speed skating at the 2025 Asian Winter Games – Men's 5000 metres =

Men's 5000 metres at the 2025 Asian Winter Games
- Venue: Heilongjiang Speed Skating Hall
- Dates: 9 February 2025
- Competitors: 16 from 6 nations

Medalists
gold medal	Wu Yu	China
silver medal	Liu Hanbin	China
bronze medal	Hanahati Muhamaiti	China

The men's 5000 metres competition in speed skating at the 2025 Asian Winter Games was held on 9 February 2025 in Harbin, China.

== Schedule ==
All times are China Standard Time (UTC+08:00)

Date	Time	Event
Sunday, 9 February 2025	12:55	Final

== Records ==
Prior to this competition, the existing world and Games records were as follows.

World Record	Nils van der Poel (SWE)	6:01.56	Salt Lake City, United States	3 December 2021
Games Record	Lee Seung-hoon (KOR)	6:24.32	Sapporo, Japan	20 February 2017

== Results ==
Legend

- DSQ — Disqualified

Rank	Pair	Athlete	Time	Notes
1st place, gold medalist(s)	8	Wu Yu (CHN)	6:27.82	
2nd place, silver medalist(s)	4	Liu Hanbin (CHN)	6:29.93	
3rd place, bronze medalist(s)	8	Hanahati Muhamaiti (CHN)	6:31.54	
4	6	Lee Seung-hoon (KOR)	6:32.43	
5	6	Chung Jae-won (KOR)	6:39.48	
6	7	Danila Semerikov (UZB)	6:39.71	
7	3	Taiyo Morino (JPN)	6:42.10	
8	5	Motonaga Arito (JPN)	6:42.63	
9	2	Vadim Yakubovskiy (KAZ)	6:47.49	
10	3	Kotaro Kasahara (JPN)	6:47.82	
11	4	Park Sang-eon (KOR)	6:50.85	
12	5	Bakdaulet Sagatov (KAZ)	6:53.77	
13	7	Vitaliy Chshigolev (KAZ)	6:53.89	
14	1	Vishwaraj Jadeja (IND)	7:47.31	
15	2	Daniel Concessao (IND)	8:28.76	
—	1	Amitesh Mishra (IND)	DSQ	
