= Chi Chunxue =

Chinese cross-country skier (born 1998)

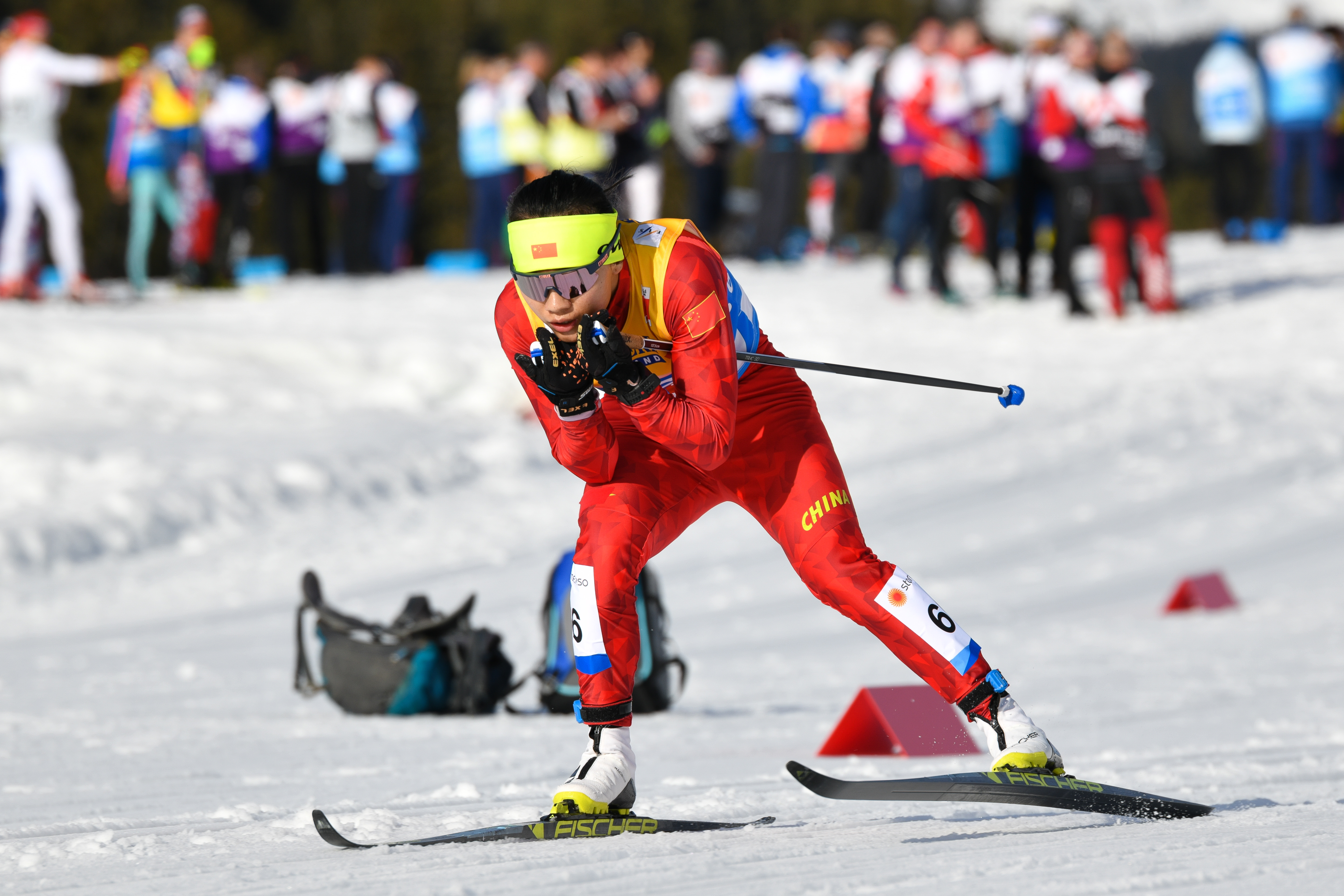
- Chi Chunxue in 2019

Personal information
- Nationality: Chinese
- Born: 4 January 1998 (age 28) Hebei, China

Sport
- Sport: Cross-country skiing
Medal record
Women's cross-country skiing
Representing China
Asian Games
Bronze medal – third place	2025 Harbin	5 km freestyle

Chi Chunxue (Chinese: 池春雪; pinyin: Chí Chūnxuě; Mandarin pronunciation: [ʈʂʰɻ̩̌ ʈʂʰwə́n ɕɥè];born 4 January 1998) is a Chinese cross-country skier.

== Career ==
She competed in the women's 15 kilometre skiathlon at the 2018 Winter Olympics. She competed at the 2022 Winter Olympics, in Women's 10 kilometre classical, Women's 30 kilometre freestyle, Women's 15 kilometre skiathlon, Women's sprint, and Women's 4 × 5 kilometre relay.
