= Speed skating at the 2025 Asian Winter Games – Women's 1500 metres =

Women's 1500 metres at the 2025 Asian Winter Games
- Venue: Heilongjiang Speed Skating Hall
- Dates: 8 February 2025
- Competitors: 16 from 4 nations

Medalists
gold medal	Han Mei	China
silver medal	Yang Binyu	China
bronze medal	Yin Qi	China

The women's 1500 metres competition in speed skating at the 2025 Asian Winter Games was held on 8 February 2025 in Harbin, China.

== Schedule ==
All times are China Standard Time (UTC+08:00)

Date	Time	Event
Saturday, 8 February 2025	14:27	Final

== Records ==
Prior to this competition, the existing world and Games records were as follows.

World Record	Miho Takagi (JPN)	1:49.83	Salt Lake City, United States	10 March 2019
Games Record	Miho Takagi (JPN)	1:56.07	Sapporo, Japan	21 February 2017

== Results ==
Rank	Pair	Athlete	Time	Notes
1st place, gold medalist(s)	8	Han Mei (CHN)	1:57.58	
2nd place, silver medalist(s)	6	Yang Binyu (CHN)	1:58.06	
3rd place, bronze medalist(s)	8	Yin Qi (CHN)	1:58.09	
4	4	Rio Yamada (JPN)	2:00.38	
5	7	Park Ji-woo (KOR)	2:00.53	
6	3	Rin Kosaka (JPN)	2:00.76	
7	6	Kang Soo-min (KOR)	2:00.96	
8	7	Nadezhda Morozova (KAZ)	2:00.97	
9	5	Yuna Onodera (JPN)	2:01.16	
10	5	Kristina Shumekova (KAZ)	2:01.27	
11	3	Ahenaer Adake (CHN)	2:01.45	
12	4	Kim Yoon-ji (KOR)	2:01.91	
13	1	Anna Kubo (JPN)	2:04.18	
14	2	Mariya Degen (KAZ)	2:05.05	
15	2	Kim Kyoung-ju (KOR)	2:06.45	
16	1	Arina Ilyachshenko (KAZ)	2:09.42	
