= Jang Yu-jin =

South Korean freestyle skier

Personal information
- Born: 1 May 2001 (age 25)
- Height: 1.67 m (5 ft 6 in)

Sport
- Country: South Korea
- Sport: Freestyle skiing
- Event: Halfpipe
Medal record
Women's freestyle skiing
Representing South Korea
Asian Winter Games
Bronze medal – third place	2025 Harbin	Halfpipe

Jang Yu-jin (born 1 May 2001) is a South Korean freestyle skier. She competed in the 2018 Winter Olympics in the women's halfpipe.
