= Bhutan at the 2025 Asian Winter Games =

- Flag of Bhutan
- IOC code: BHU
- NOC: Bhutan Olympic Committee

in Harbin, China 7 February 2025 – 14 February 2025
- Competitors: 1 in 1 sport
- Flag bearer: Chencho Dorji
- Medals: Gold 0 Silver 0 Bronze 0 Total 0

Asian Winter Games appearances
- 2025; 2029

Bhutan competed at the 2025 Asian Winter Games in Harbin, China, from February 7 to 14. Bhutan is scheduled to make its Asian Winter Games debut. The Bhutanese team consisted of male alpine skier. As the country's only athlete, Dorji was the country's opening ceremony flagbearer.

== Competitors ==
The following table lists the Bhutanese delegation per sport and gender.

Sport	Men	Women	Total
Alpine skiing	1	0	1
Total	1	0	1

== Alpine skiing ==
Bhutan entered one male alpine skier. Chencho Dorji who spent his childhood and currently resides in Chamonix, France, represented the country. Dorji was born in Bhutan, and was adopted at two years old by a French national and has resided there ever since.

Due to issues with his FIS license, Dorji's results was not included in the official report. Bhutanese media reported that Dorji's time would have placed him on 23rd place in the men's slalom.

== See also ==
- Bhutan at the 2024 Summer Olympics
