= Lian Ziwen =

Chinese speed skater (born 1998)

Personal information
- Born: 26 September 1998 (age 27) Harbin, China
- Height: 1.83 m (6 ft 0 in)

Sport
- Country: China
- Sport: Speed skating
Medal record
Men's speed skating
Representing China
World Single Distances Championships
Gold medal – first place	2025 Hamar	Team sprint
Four Continents Championships
Silver medal – second place	2025 Hachinohe	Team sprint
Asian Winter Games
Gold medal – first place	2025 Harbin	Team sprint
Bronze medal – third place	2025 Harbin	1000 m

Lian Ziwen (Chinese: 廉子文; pinyin: Lián Zǐwén; born 26 September 1998) is a Chinese speed skater who represented China at the 2022 Winter Olympics and the 2026 Winter Olympics.

== Career ==
Lian represented China at the 2022 Winter Olympics in the 1000 metres, 1500 metres and team pursuit.

In November 2024, he represented China at the 2025 Four Continents Speed Skating Championships and won a silver medal in the team sprint.

In February 2025, he represented China at the 2025 Asian Winter Games and won a gold medal in the team sprint and a bronze medal in the 1000 metres. The next month he competed at the 2025 World Single Distances Speed Skating Championships and won a gold medal in the team sprint, along with Xue Zhiwen and Ning Zhongyan.

In February 2026, he represented China at the 2026 Winter Olympics in the 500 metres and 1000 metres. He was disqualified from the 1000 m race for hindering his rival Joep Wennemars as the latter was preparing to cross into the inside track.
