= Chen Xuezheng =

Chinese freestyle skier (born 2008)

Sport
- Sport: Freestyle skiing
- Event: Aerials
Medal record
Women's freestyle skiing
Representing China
Asian Winter Games
Silver medal – second place	2025 Harbin	aerials

Chen Xuezheng is a Chinese freestyle skier specializing in aerials.

== Career ==
In February 2025, Chen competed at the 2025 Asian Winter Games and won a silver medal in the aerials event, with a score of 81.58. The next month she competed at the 2025 FIS Freestyle Ski World Championships and advanced to the finals, finishing in fourth place.
