= Han Linshan =

Chinese freestyle skier (born 2006)

Personal information
- Born: 20 September 2006 (age 20) Jilin, China

Sport
- Country: China
- Sport: Freestyle skiing
- Events: Slopestyle, Big air
Medal record
Womn's freestyle skiing
Representing China
Asian Winter Games
Silver medal – second place	2025 Harbin	Big air
Bronze medal – third place	2025 Harbin	Slopestyle
Winter Youth Olympics
Silver medal – second place	2024 Gangwon	Slopestyle
Junior World Championships
Silver medal – second place	2023 Cardrona	Big air

Han Linshan (Chinese: 韩林杉; born 20 September 2006) is a Chinese freestyle skier.

== Career ==
Han competed at the 2023 FIS Freestyle Junior World Ski Championships and won a silver medal in the big air event. She then qualified to represent China at the 2024 Winter Youth Olympics. During the Winter Youth Olympics she won a silver medal in the slopestyle event with a score of 81.50.

She represented China at the 2025 Asian Winter Games and won a silver medal in the big air event, and a bronze medal in slopestyle event. In January 2026, she was selected to represent China at the 2026 Winter Olympics. During the slopestyle qualification she ranked fifth and advanced to the finals.
