= Liu Mengting =

Chinese freestyle skier (born 2004)

Personal information
- Born: 23 April 2004 (age 22) Jilin, China

Sport
- Sport: Freestyle skiing
Medal record
Women's freestyle skiing
Representing China
Asian Winter Games
Gold medal – first place	2025 Harbin	Big air
Gold medal – first place	2025 Harbin	Slopestyle

Liu Mengting (born 23 April 2004) is a Chinese freestyle skier. She represented China at the 2026 Winter Olympics.

== Career ==
Liu represented China at the 2025 Asian Winter Games where she served as a flag bearer during the Parade of Nations. On 11 February 2025, she won a gold medal in the slopestyle event with a score of 94.00. The next day she won a gold medal in the big air event with a score of 175.50.

During the opening race of the 2025–26 FIS Freestyle Ski World Cup on 28 November 2025 she won a bronze medal in the big air event with a score of 165.25. The next week she won a silver medal in big air with a score of 172.25.

In January 2026, she was selected to represent China at the 2026 Winter Olympics.

== Results ==
=== Olympic Winter Games ===
Year	Age	Slopestyle	Big Air
(Italy) 2026 Milano Cortina	21	5	7

=== World Championships ===
Year	Age	Slopestyle	Big Air
(Georgia (country)) 2023 Bakuriani	18	17	14
(Switzerland) 2025 Engadin	20	8	6
