= Wu Yu (speed skater) =

Chinese speed skater (born 1997)

Personal information
- Born: 20 September 1997 (age 28) Jinzhou, China
- Height: 1.85 m (6 ft 1 in)

Sport
- Country: China
- Sport: Speed skating
- Event(s): 5000 m, team pursuit
Medal record
Men's speed skating
Representing China
Olympic Games
Bronze medal – third place	2026 Milano Cortina	Team pursuit
Asian Winter Games
Gold medal – first place	2025 Harbin	5000 m
Gold medal – first place	2025 Harbin	Team pursuit

Wu Yu (born 20 September 1997) is a Chinese speed skater.

== Career ==
Wu competed at the 2024 World Allround Speed Skating Championships and finished in 13th place overall. He then represented China at the 2025 Asian Winter Games and won a gold medal in the 5000 metres with a time of 6:27.82. He also won a gold medal in the team pursuit with a time of 3:45.94.

In January 2026, he was selected to represent China at the 2026 Winter Olympics. He won a bronze medal in the team pursuit event with a time of 3:41.38.
