= Liu Hanbin =

Chinese speed skater (born 2006)

Personal information
- Born: 5 August 2006 (age 19) Jilin, China

Sport
- Country: China
- Sport: Speed skating
- Event(s): 1500 m, 5000 m, team pursuit
Medal record
Men's speed skating
Representing China
Olympic Games
Bronze medal – third place	2026 Milano Cortina	Team pursuit
Asian Winter Games
Gold medal – first place	2025 Harbin	Team pursuit
Silver medal – second place	2025 Harbin	5000 m
World Junior Championships
Gold medal – first place	2026 Inzell	5000 m

Liu Hanbin (born 5 August 2006) is a Chinese speed skater.

== Career ==
Liu represented China at the 2025 Asian Winter Games and won a gold medal in the team pursuit with a time of 3:45.94. He also won a silver medal in the 5000 metres with a time of 6:29.93.

In January 2026, he was selected to represent China at the 2026 Winter Olympics. He won a bronze medal in the team pursuit event with a time of 3:41.38.
