= Han Mei (speed skater) =

Chinese speed skater (born 1998)

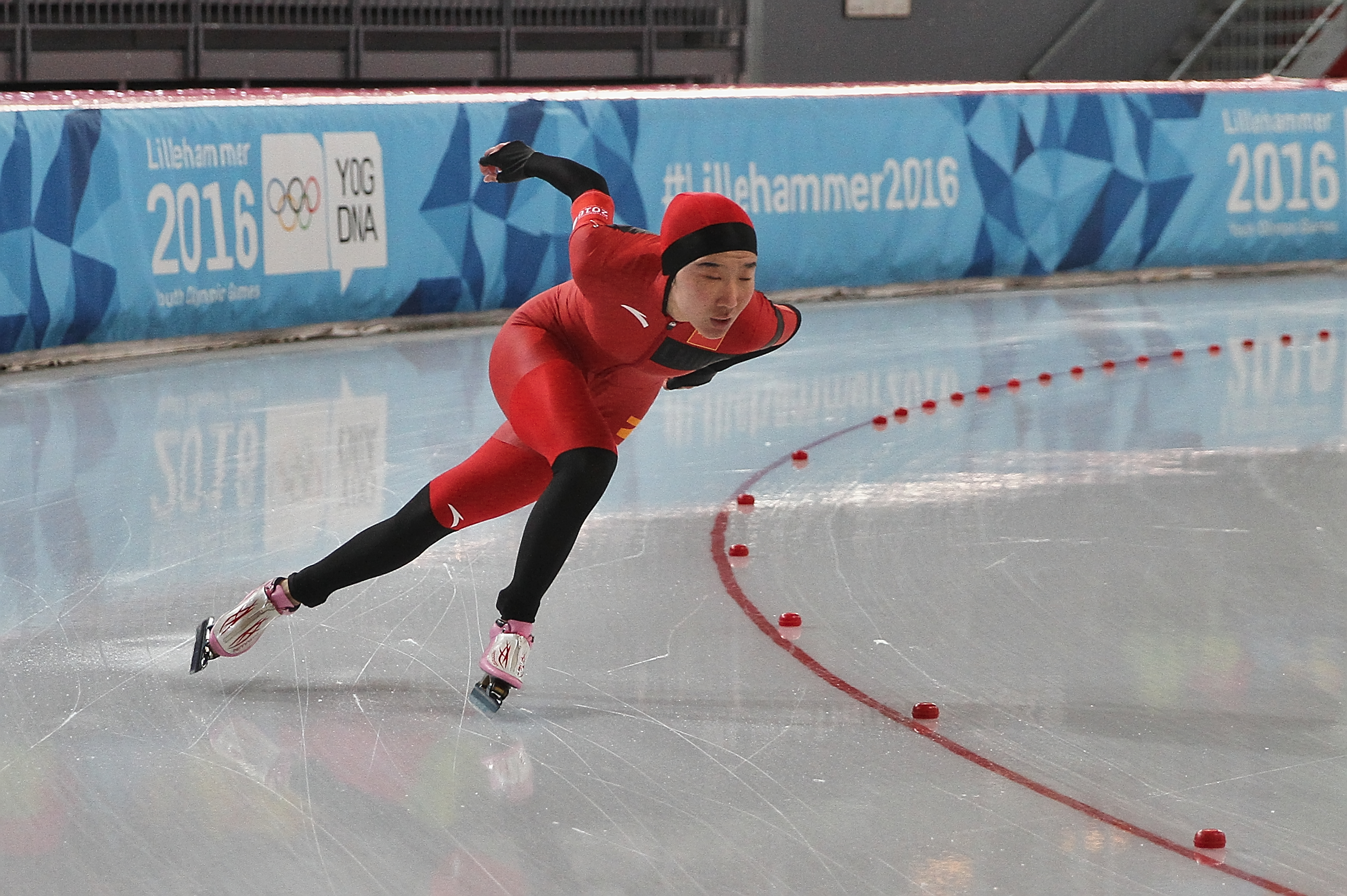
- Han pictured competing in 2016

Personal information
- Nationality: Chinese
- Born: 27 January 1998 (age 28) Hohhot, China
- Height: 1.66 m (5 ft 5 in)
- Weight: 64 kg (141 lb)

Sport
- Country: China
- Sport: Speed skating
- Event: 1000 m
Medal record
Women's speed skating
Representing China
World Single Distances Championships
| Silver medal – second place | 2024 Calgary | 1000 m |
| Silver medal – second place | 2024 Calgary | 1500 m |
| Bronze medal – third place | 2025 Hamar | 1500 m |
Four Continents Championships
| Silver medal – second place | 2025 Hachinohe | 1500 m |
Asian Winter Games
| Gold medal – first place | 2025 Harbin | 1000 m |
| Gold medal – first place | 2025 Harbin | 1500 m |
| Gold medal – first place | 2025 Harbin | Team pursuit |
| Silver medal – second place | 2017 Sapporo | 5000 m |
| Silver medal – second place | 2025 Harbin | 3000 m |
| Silver medal – second place | 2025 Harbin | Team sprint |
| Bronze medal – third place | 2017 Sapporo | Team pursuit |

Han Mei
- Simplified Chinese: 韩梅
- Traditional Chinese: 韓梅
Transcriptions
Standard Mandarin
- Hanyu Pinyin: Hán Méi
- IPA: [xǎn měɪ]

Han Mei (Chinese: 韩梅; pinyin: Hán Méi; born 27 January 1998) is a Chinese speed skater.

== Career ==
At the 2016 Youth Olympic Games in Lillehammer, Han won three silver medals. She competed at the ISU Junior Speed Skating World Cup and won the silver medal in the Women's 1000m category. She competed in the 2018 Winter Olympics in the Women's team pursuit.
