= Yabuli Ski Resort =

Ski resort in China

Yabuli
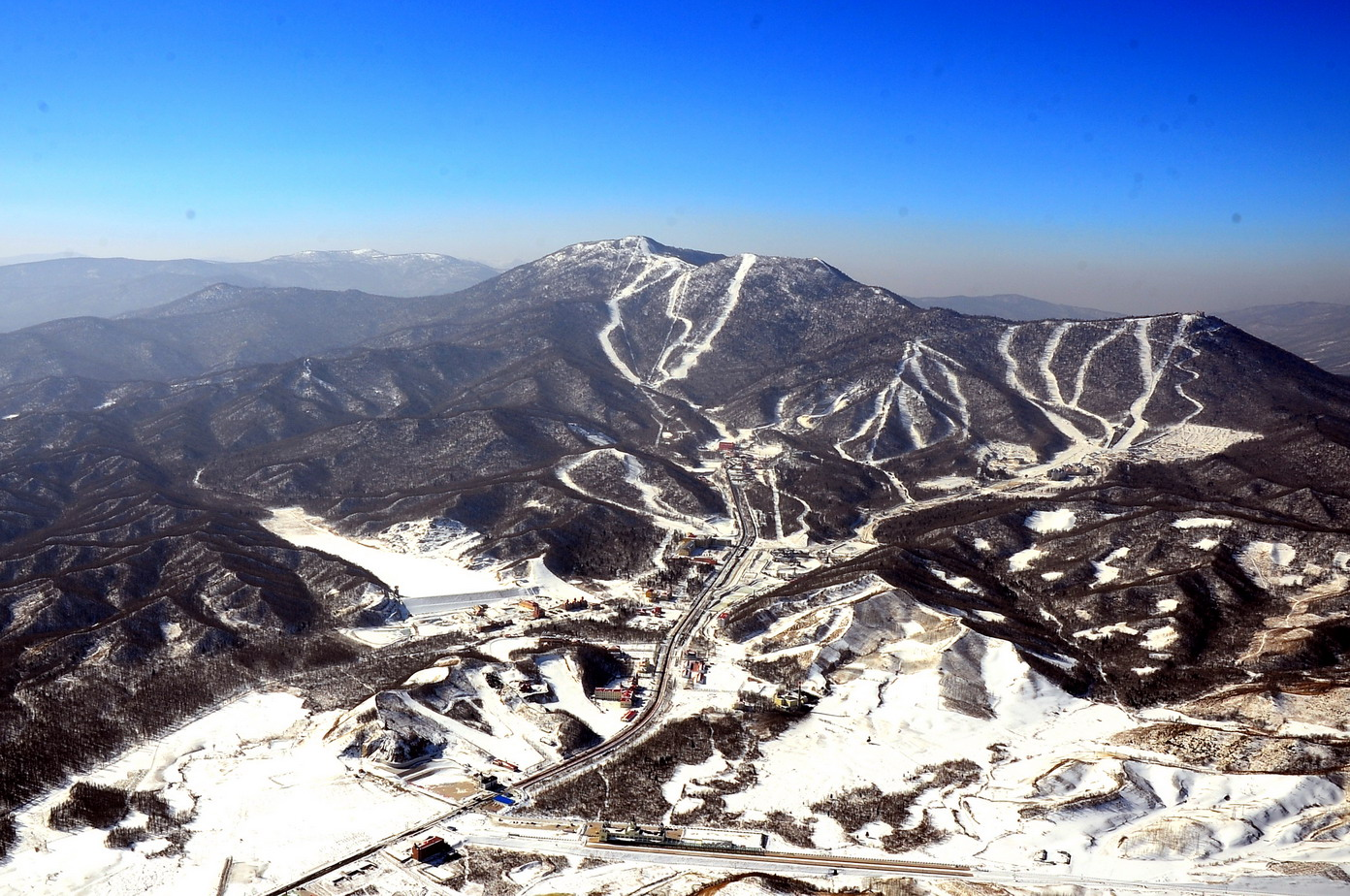
- Sun Mountain, Yabuli
- Interactive map of Yabuli
- Location: Changbai Mountains
- Nearest city: Shangzhi, Heilongjiang, China
- Coordinates: 44°46′53.24″N 128°27′00.75″E
- Top elevation: 1,345 m (4,413 ft)
- Base elevation: 397 m (1,302 ft)

Yabuli Ski Resort (simplified Chinese: 亚布力滑雪旅游度假区; traditional Chinese: 亞布力滑雪旅遊度假區; pinyin: Yàbùlì Huáxuě Lǚyóu Dùjià Qū) is the largest ski resort in China and includes the country's largest ski jumping facilities. It is located in the northeastern province of Heilongjiang, 110 mi (177 km) southeast from Harbin, approximately 2.5hrs by train.

== Geography ==
The Yabuli Ski Resort is located in the Changbai Mountains, one of the major mountain ranges in the northeastern part of China.

== Sport events and facilities ==
Yabuli hosted the 1996 Winter Asian Games, the 2008 National Winter Games and the 2009 Winter Universiade. Yabuli underwent major renovations in the 2008/2009 winter season. A new four seater Doppelmayr chairlift was installed, along with a six-seater gondola. Existing lifts consist of single chairlift, double chairlifts and poma's. Three new on-snow hotels/lodges are being constructed and should be open by mid-January 2009.

=== 2009 Winter Universiade ===
In February 2009 Yabuli Ski Resort hosted the Alpine, Nordic, and Freestyle Skiing events of the 2009 Winter Universiade. Student athletes from 44 countries competed in the games. The ice hockey, figure skating, speed skating and curling events were held in the city of Harbin, while the snowboarding events and biathlon were held in Mao'ershan Ski Resort. Yabuli Ski Resort received substantial infrastructure upgrades prior to the games, including a 4-seater chair, gondola, a modern ski hire and hotel near the base of the resort.

=== Snowboarding ===
- 2016 World Champions of Snowboarding
- 2015 FIS Snowboard Junior World Championships

=== Yabuli Sports Training Base ===
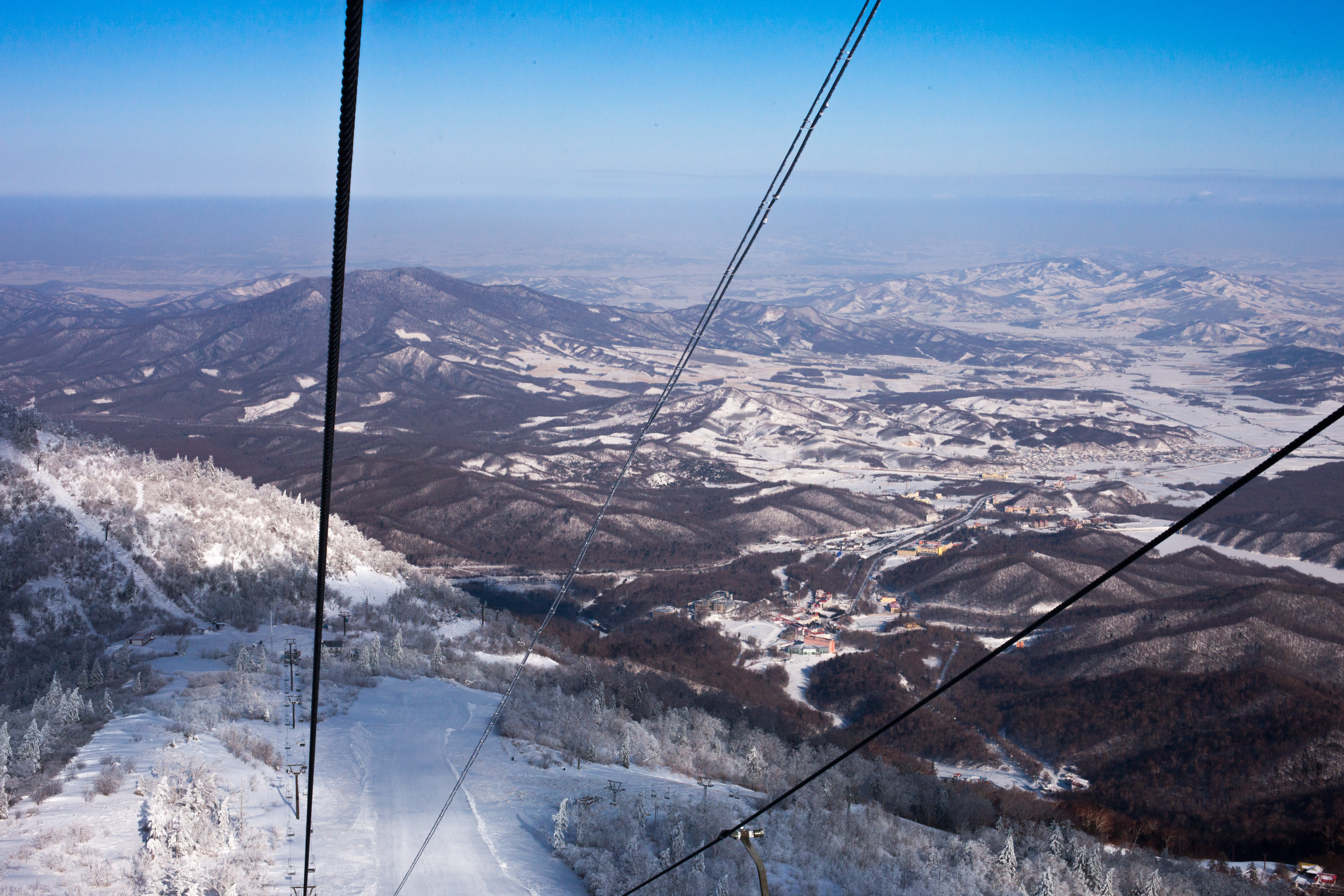
Yabuli Ski Resort

Yabuli Sports Training Base (Chinese: 亚布力体育训练基地) is a key venue for the 2025 Asian Winter Games. Primarily focused on snow sports, it features FIS-certified alpine skiing courses (maximum vertical drop: 812 meters), a 90-meter ski jumping hill with K90 profile, and a 12.5 km biathlon track equipped with electronic target systems.

The base operates snowmaking infrastructure capable of covering 50 hectares, ensuring conditions from November to March. It hosts training for Alpine skiing, ski jumping, Nordic combined, and bobsleigh, supported by a sports science center offering biomechanics analysis and cryotherapy facilities. A climate-controlled indoor training hall (8,000 m²) allows year-round athlete preparation. Designated as China's National Winter Sports Training Hub since 2016, Yabuli upgraded its RFID timing systems and high-definition broadcast platforms for the Games. Its athlete village accommodates 1,200 participants, with dedicated medical stations for cold-weather injury prevention.
