= 2025 Asian Winter Games =

Multi-sport event in Harbin, China

IX Asian Winter Games
- Logo of the 2025 Asian Winter Games
- Host city: Harbin, China
- Motto: Dream of Winter, Love Among Asia (冰雪同梦，亚洲同心)
- Nations: 34
- Athletes: 1,222
- Events: 64 in 11 sports
- Opening: 7 February 2025
- Closing: 14 February 2025
- Opened by: Xi Jinping; President of China (Note: OCA states Xi Jinping opened the Games as "Chinese President", de jure head of state. Though Xi Jinping was also de facto ruler as General Secretary of the Chinese Communist Party, that title is not reflected in OCA records.)
- Closed by: Timothy Fok; Vice President of the Olympic Council of Asia
- Judge's Oath: Zhang Chunhui; Chen Wenhong
- Torch lighter: Zhang Hong
- Ceremony venue: Harbin International Convention Exhibition and Sports Center ABC Hall (main venue); Harbin Ice and Snow World (sub-venue)
- Website: harbin2025.com

Summer

Winter

The 2025 Asian Winter Games (Chinese: 第九届亚洲冬季运动会; pinyin: Dì jiǔ jiè yàzhōu dōngjì yùndònghuì), officially known as the IX Asian Winter Games, and commonly known as Harbin 2025 (哈尔滨2025), were the ninth edition of the Asian Winter Games, a multi-sport event held between 7 and 14 February 2025 in Harbin, Heilongjiang, China. This was the second time that Harbin has hosted the event and the third time China had hosted the Asian Winter Games.

== Bidding process ==
After an invitation made by the Olympic Council of Asia (OCA) and accepted shortly afterwards, Harbin became effective as host city during the 42th Executive Session of OCA held in Bangkok, Thailand, on 8 July 2023.

=== Host city ===
- Harbin, China: On 28 June 2023, the Harbin government held a press briefing on the city's bid for the 2025 Asian Winter Games, the government official revealed that all preparations for the bid have been completed.

2025 Asian Winter Games bidding results
City	NOC	Round 1
Harbin	China	Only bidder

=== Interested parties ===
- Seoul, Gangwon or Jeonju, South Korea

== Development and preparations ==
=== Emblem and mascot ===
The official emblem and mascots were unveiled the same day as the slogan reveal on 11 January 2024. The emblem "Breakthrough", consists of three distinct elements: the emblem motif, the abbreviated name of the Games and the OCA symbol. The emblem motif integrates the designs of a short track speed skater, a lilac (the city flower of Harbin) and swirling ribbons into one cohesive composition. With gradients of blue and purple, it simulates the light and shadow refracted when sunlight hits the ice, depicting the charm of winter sports. The swirling ribbon embodies the tribute to the past and aspirations for the future. Only by constant breakthroughs can one embrace the most promising future. The posture of the short track speed skater embodies the sportsmanship of the athletes of the nations and regions of Asia. The purple lilac embodies Harbin's city culture of openness, while the purple-blue hues symbolize ice and snow, reflecting the unique features of the "Ice City" (Harbin) and its passion for winter sports. The swirling ribbon adds a joyous visual to the emblem, depicting the enthusiasm of the people of Harbin. The OCA symbol in the upper left captures the hope, vitality and long-standing aspiration of Asian countries to pursue progress and peace, and to strive for the Olympic motto of "Citius, Altius, Fortius", which is Latin for "Faster, Higher, Stronger".

The mascots of the event are Binbin and Nini, a pair of Siberian tigers. Binbin represents the ice events, while Nini represents the snow events. Their names embody the Games' mantra "Welcome to Harbin". Binbin shows off his winter sportswear, boldly donning a red scarf and blue gloves and sharing his joy of ice dancing, as Nini is snowboarding, wearing a traditional Chinese red cotton jacket with a warm fluffy collar and snowflake patterns that display a festive look.

=== Motto ===
The official motto of the 2025 Asian Winter Games, "Dream of Winter, Love among Asia", was announced on 11 January 2024.

=== Venues ===
On 27 February 2024, the OCA confirmed the venues for the 2025 Asian Winter Games.

Venue	City	Sport	Capacity
Harbin International Convention Exhibition and Sports Center ABC Hall	Harbin	Opening and closing ceremonies main venue	8,000
Harbin Ice and Snow World	Harbin	Opening and closing ceremonies sub-venue	
Pingfang District Curling Arena	Harbin	Curling	216
Harbin Sport University Student Skating Hall	Harbin	Ice hockey (men and women)	2,200
Harbin Ice Hockey Arena	Harbin	Ice hockey (men)	5,304
Heilongjiang Winter Sports Training Center Arena	Harbin	Figure skating and Short track speed skating	2,767
Heilongjiang Winter Sports Training Center Speed Skating Rink	Harbin	Speed Skating	1,594
Yabuli Ski Resort	Shangzhi	Alpine skiing, Biathlon, Cross-country skiing, Freestyle skiing, Ski mountaineering and Snowboarding	

== The Games ==
=== Opening ceremony ===
On the evening of 7 February, the inaugural ceremony of the 9th Asian Winter Games took place, attended by Chinese president and general secretary of the Chinese Communist Party Xi Jinping, who officially declared the commencement of the Asian Winter Games. Sports delegations from 34 nations and areas arrived sequentially and received a warm reception from the entire audience. Foreign dignitaries present at the inaugural ceremony comprised Hassanal Bolkiah of Brunei, President Sadyr Japarov of Kyrgyzstan, President Asif Ali Zardari of Pakistan, Prime Minister Paetongtarn Shinawatra of Thailand, and Speaker of the National Assembly Woo Won-shik of South Korea.

Party and state leaders Cai Qi, Wang Yi, He Lifeng, Wang Xiaohong, Shen Yiqin; John Lee Ka-chiu, Chief Executive of the Hong Kong Special Administrative Region, and Sam Hou Fai, Chief Executive of the Macao Special Administrative Region, attended the inauguration ceremony.

=== Sports ===
In October 2023, the Olympic Council of Asia announced the full sports program. 64 events across 11 winter sport disciplines, were scheduled in the 2025 Asian Winter Games program. The five ice sports are curling, figure skating, speed skating, short-track speed skating and ice hockey, along with skiing. Ski mountaineering was also held for the first time at the Asian Winter Games. The discipline of ski jumping was dropped after being contested at the last edition of the games.

Numbers in parentheses indicate the number of medal events contested in each sports discipline.

- Alpine skiing (2)
- Biathlon (4)
- Cross-country skiing (6)
- Curling (3)
- Figure skating (4)
- Freestyle skiing (11)
- Ice hockey (2)
- Short-track speed skating (9)
- Ski mountaineering (3)
- Snowboarding (6)
- Speed skating (14)

=== Closing ceremony ===
The 9th Asian Winter Games in Harbin concluded on the evening of 14 February 2025. Premier Li Qiang participated in the concluding ceremony. Wang Hesheng, Vice Mayor of Harbin, transferred the OCA flag to Timothy Fok, first vice president of the OCA, who then passed it to Prince Abdulaziz bin Turki Al-Faisal, president of the Saudi Arabian Olympic Committee. International dignitaries present at the closing ceremony included Prime Minister Luvsannamsrain Oyun-Erdene of Mongolia and Prime Minister Mark Brown of the Cook Islands. Chinese officials Wu Zhenglong and Shen Yiqin were also present at the closing ceremony.

== Participating National Olympic Committees ==
A total of 34 NOC's competed, surpassing the previous record high of 30 Olympic Council of Asia NOC's competing at one edition in 2017. Bhutan, Cambodia and Saudi Arabia made their Asian Winter Games debut. However, the sole competitor of Bhutan, an alpine skier, is ineligible for a medal due to FIS license issues.

Afghanistan and Bahrain returned to the games after missing the last edition in 2017, while Timor-Leste, which competed in 2017, did not return. The organizers expected a total of 1,275 athletes (755 men and 520 women) to compete, which would have broken the previous record, but the actual number registered was only 1,222 athletes and officials.

- Afghanistan (3)
- Bahrain (18)
- Bhutan (1)
- Cambodia (4)
- China (170) (hosts)
- Hong Kong (73)
- India (59)
- Indonesia (6)
- Iran (14)
- Japan (151)
- Jordan (1)
- Kazakhstan (138)
- Kuwait (25)
- Kyrgyzstan (40)
- Lebanon (17)
- Macau (21)
- Malaysia (8)
- Mongolia (35)
- Nepal (4)
- North Korea (3)
- Pakistan (2)
- Philippines (19)
- Qatar (15)
- Saudi Arabia (8)
- Singapore (23)
- South Korea (149)
- Sri Lanka (4)
- Chinese Taipei (67)
- Tajikistan (4)
- Thailand (85)
- Turkmenistan (24)
- United Arab Emirates (7)
- Uzbekistan (23)
- Vietnam (1)

== Calendar ==
On 27 February 2024, the OCA published the competition schedule of 2025 Asian Winter Games. The speed skating competition awarded the most gold medals, with 14 in total, followed by freestyle skiing, which will award 11 gold medals.

OC	Opening ceremony	●	Event competitions	1	Event finals	CC	Closing ceremony

Event/Date→	February 2025												Events
Event/Date→	3 Mon	4 Tue	5 Wed	6 Thu	7 Fri	8 Sat	9 Sun	10 Mon	11 Tue	12 Wed	13 Thu	14 Fri	Events
Ceremonies					OC							CC	
Alpine skiing						1	1						2
Biathlon									2		2		4
Cross-country skiing						2	1	1		2			6
Curling		●	●	●	●	1	●	●	●	●	●	2	3
Figure skating									●	2	2		4
Freestyle skiing						2	2	1	4	2			11
Ice hockey	●	●	●	●	●	●	●	●	●	●	●	2	2
Short-track speed skating					●	5	4						9
Ski mountaineering							2			1			3
Snowboarding						2		2		2			6
Speed skating						4	3	3	4				14
Total events						17	13	7	10	9	4	4	64
Cumulative total						17	30	37	47	56	60	64	
Event/Date→	3 Mon	4 Tue	5 Wed	6 Thu	7 Fri	8 Sat	9 Sun	10 Mon	11 Tue	12 Wed	13 Thu	14 Fri	Events
Event/Date→	February 2025												Events

== Medal table ==
The host, China, led the medal table for the fourth time at the Asian Winter Games. China won the most gold medals (32, 50% of all gold medals awarded), the most silver medals (27), the most bronze medals (26), and the most medals overall (85, 44% of all medals awarded). Three nations won their first Asian Winter Games medal: Chinese Taipei won a bronze in speed skating on 8 February, Thailand won a bronze in freestyle skiing on 11 February, and the Philippines won a gold in the men's curling tournament on 14 February.

* Host nation (China)

Rank	Nation	Gold	Silver	Bronze	Total
1	China*	32	27	26	85
2	South Korea	16	15	14	45
3	Japan	10	12	15	37
4	Kazakhstan	4	9	7	20
5	Philippines	1	0	0	1
5	Uzbekistan	1	0	0	1
7	North Korea	0	1	0	1
8	Chinese Taipei	0	0	1	1
8	Thailand	0	0	1	1
Totals (9 entries)		64	64	64	192

== Controversies ==
=== Ice hockey incident ===
At the conclusion of the men's ice hockey match between Hong Kong and Turkmenistan, Turkmenistani players attacked members of the Hong Kong team. The Sports Federation and Olympic Committee of Hong Kong, China, issued a statement "strongly condemning" the incident. Three Turkmenistani players Erkin Kakabayev, Arslan Geldimyradov, and Begench Dovletmyradov attacked several Hong Kong players, with the altercation lasting several minutes before referees were able to restore order. While none of the Hong Kong players sustained serious injuries, three were taken to the hospital as a precaution, including one who required stitches on his hand. As result, IIHF suspended four Turkmenistani players—Kakabayev, Geldimyradov, Dovletmyradov, and Novruz Bayhanov—from the remainder of the competition.

=== Alleged cyberattack ===
In April 2025, the Chinese government, through its National Computer Virus Emergency Response Center (CVERC), said that from 26 January and 14 February, the information systems for the Games were subjected to more than two hundred thousand foreign cyberattacks and accused the United States of being behind most of the attacks. CVERC said that the attacks did not cause significant damage, and condemned cyberattacks targeting major international events. The allegation were made in the midst of a trade war between the US and China and after the US accused Beijing of carrying out a cyberespionage campaign that targeted US-based critics of Beijing.

== See also ==
- Previous Asian Winter Games in China
  - 1996 Asian Winter Games – also held in Harbin
  - 2007 Asian Winter Games – Changchun
- 2009 Winter Universiade – also held in Harbin.

== Notes ==
Preceded by Sapporo	Asian Winter Games; Harbin; IX Asian Winter Games (2025)	Succeeded by Almaty
