= Cross-country skiing at the 2025 Asian Winter Games =

- Venue: Yabuli Ski Resort
- Dates: 8–12 February 2025
- Competitors: 96 from 14 nations

Cross-country skiing competitions at the 2025 Asian Winter Games in Harbin, China, were held at Yabuli Ski Resort between 8 and 12 February 2025.

== Schedule ==
Q	Qualification	F	Final

Event↓/Date →	8th Sat		9th Sun	10th Mon	11th Tue	12th Wed
Men's sprint classical	Q	F				
Men's 10 km freestyle				F		
Men's 4 × 7.5 km relay						F
Women's sprint classical	Q	F				
Women's 5 km freestyle			F			
Women's 4 × 5 km relay						F

== Medalists ==
=== Men ===
Event	Gold	Silver	Bronze
Sprint classical	Wang Qiang; China	Konstantin Bortsov; Kazakhstan	Saimuhaer Sailike; China
10 km freestyle	Haruki Yamashita; Japan	Takatsugu Uda; Japan	Olzhas Klimin; Kazakhstan
4 × 7.5 km relay	China; Li Minglin; Ciren Zhandui; Bao Lin; Wang Qiang	Japan; Shota Moriguchi; Takatsugu Uda; Yuito Habuki; Haruki Yamashita	Kazakhstan; Konstantin Bortsov; Nail Bashmakov; Olzhas Klimin; Vladislav Kovalyov

=== Women ===
Event	Gold	Silver	Bronze
Sprint classical	Li Lei; China	Meng Honglian; China	Dinigeer Yilamujiang; China
5 km freestyle	Bayani Jialin; China	Dinigeer Yilamujiang; China	Chi Chunxue; China
4 × 5 km relay	China; Li Lei; Chi Chunxue; Chen Lingshuang; Dinigeer Yilamujiang	Kazakhstan; Xeniya Shalygina; Kamila Yelgazinova; Angelina Shuryga; Nadezhda Stepashkina	Japan; Mayu Yamamoto; Chika Kobayashi; Yuka Yamazaki; Karen Hatakeyama

== Medal table ==
Rank	Nation	Gold	Silver	Bronze	Total
1	China (CHN)	5	2	3	10
2	Japan (JPN)	1	2	1	4
3	Kazakhstan (KAZ)	0	2	2	4
Totals (3 entries)		6	6	6	18

== Participating nations ==
A total of 96 athletes from 14 nations competed in cross-country skiing at the 2025 Asian Winter Games:

- China (12)
- Chinese Taipei (5)
- India (6)
- Iran (8)
- Japan (9)
- Kazakhstan (12)
- Kyrgyzstan (7)
- Lebanon (4)
- Malaysia (1)
- Mongolia (10)
- Pakistan (1)
- South Korea (9)
- Sri Lanka (4)
- Thailand (8)
