= 2025 Asian Winter Games Parade of Nations =

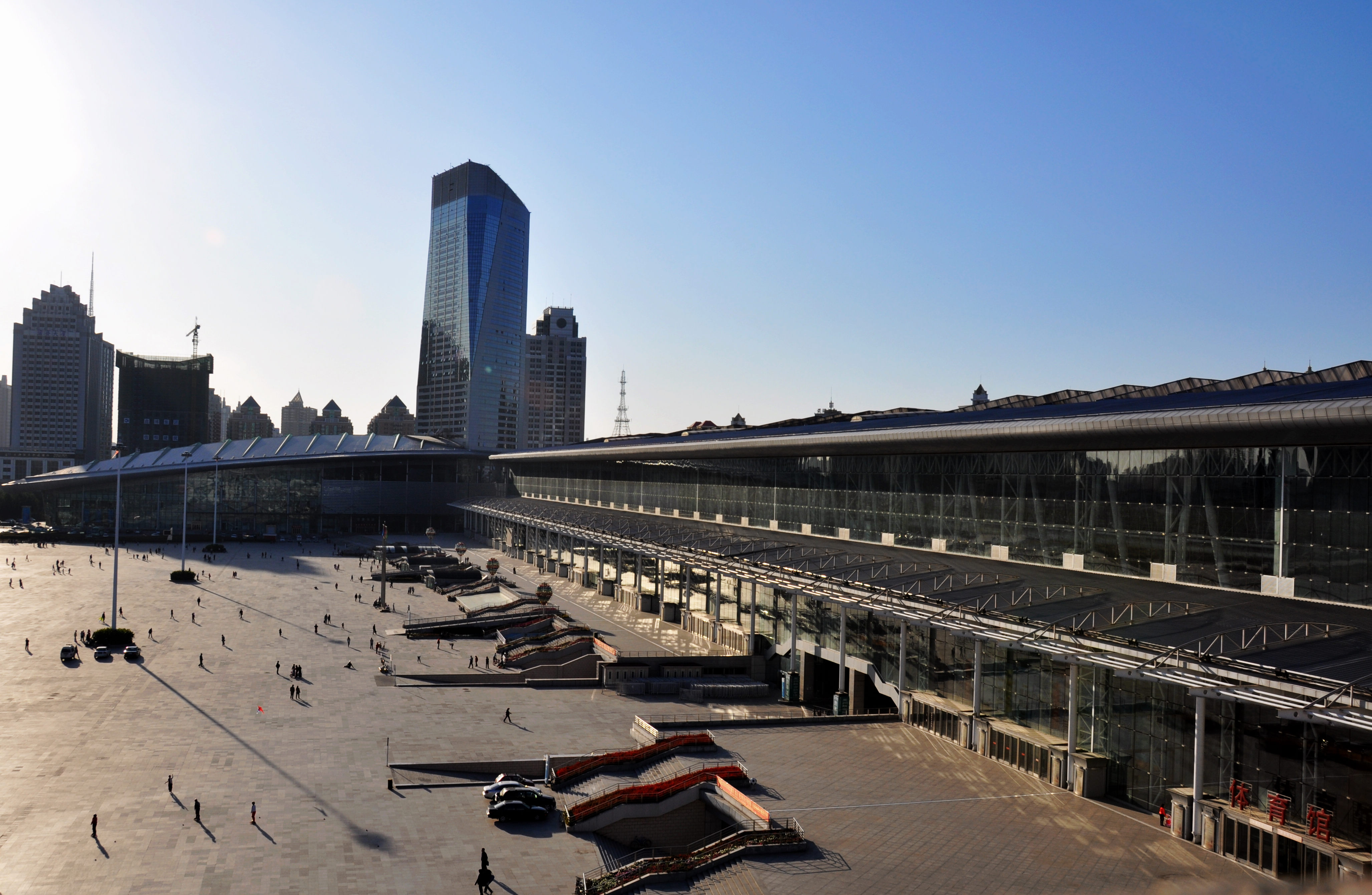
The Harbin International Convention Exhibition and Sports Center hosted the opening ceremony.

During the Parade of Nations at the 2025 Asian Winter Games opening ceremony, held on 7 February 2025, athletes bearing the flags of their respective nations led their national delegations as they paraded into the Harbin International Convention Exhibition and Sports Center in the host city of Harbin, China.

== Countries and flagbearers ==
Order	Nation	Chinese name	Pinyin	Flag bearer	Sport	Reference
1	Afghanistan	阿富汗	Āfùhàn	Nizaruddin Ali Zada	Snowboarding	
1	Afghanistan	阿富汗	Āfùhàn	—N/a		
2	Bahrain	巴林	Bālín	Sameh Hegazi	Ice hockey	
2	Bahrain	巴林	Bālín	Malak Janahi	Team official	
3	Bhutan	不丹	Bùdān	Chencho Dorji	Alpine skiing	
3	Bhutan	不丹	Bùdān	—N/a		
4	Cambodia	柬埔寨	Jiǎnpǔzhài	Panhasith Pisey	Snowboarding	
4	Cambodia	柬埔寨	Jiǎnpǔzhài	—N/a		
5	North Korea (DPR Korea)	朝鲜	Cháoxiǎn	Han Kum-chol	Figure skating	
5	North Korea (DPR Korea)	朝鲜	Cháoxiǎn	Ryom Tae-ok	Figure skating	
6	Hong Kong (Hong Kong, China)	中国香港	Zhōngguó Xiānggǎng	Adrian Yung	Alpine skiing	
6	Hong Kong (Hong Kong, China)	中国香港	Zhōngguó Xiānggǎng	Lam Ching Yan	Short-track speed skating	
7	India	印度	Yìndù	Arif Khan	Alpine skiing	
7	India	印度	Yìndù	Bhavani Thekkada	Cross-country skiing	
8	Indonesia	印度尼西亚	Yìndùníxīyà	Dwiki Eka Ramadhan	Figure skating	
8	Indonesia	印度尼西亚	Yìndùníxīyà	Kelly Supangat	Figure skating	
9	Iran	伊朗	Yīlǎng	Mohammad Kiadarbandsari	Alpine skiing	
9	Iran	伊朗	Yīlǎng	Marzieh Beha	Ski mountaineering	
10	Japan	日本	Rìběn	Haruki Watanabe	Curling	
10	Japan	日本	Rìběn	Yuka Takahashi	Speed skating	
11	Jordan	约旦	Yuēdàn	Sharif Zawaideh	Alpine skiing	
11	Jordan	约旦	Yuēdàn	—N/a		
12	Kazakhstan	哈萨克斯坦	Hāsàkèsītǎn	Adil Beketayev	Ice hockey	
12	Kazakhstan	哈萨克斯坦	Hāsàkèsītǎn	Olga Tikhonova	Short-track speed skating	
13	South Korea	韩国	Hánguó	Chong-Min Lee	Ice hockey	
13	South Korea	韩国	Hánguó	Gim Eun-ji	Curling	
14	Kuwait	科威特	Kēwēitè	Mohammed Al Duaij	Ice hockey	
14	Kuwait	科威特	Kēwēitè	Fatema Abdulateef	Curling	
15	Kyrgyzstan	吉尔吉斯斯坦	Jíěrjísīsītǎn	Seifulov Mamed	Ice hockey	
15	Kyrgyzstan	吉尔吉斯斯坦	Jíěrjísīsītǎn	Keremet Asanbaeva	Curling	
16	Lebanon	黎巴嫩	Líbānèn	Maurizio Sottile	Team official	
16	Lebanon	黎巴嫩	Líbānèn	Joanne Diwan	Team official	
17	Macau (Macao, China)	中国澳门	Zhōngguó Àomén	Leong Chon Kong	Ice hockey	
17	Macau (Macao, China)	中国澳门	Zhōngguó Àomén	Cheong Hio Lam	Team official	
18	Malaysia	马来西亚	Mǎláixīyà	Wei Yan Tang	Cross-country skiing	
18	Malaysia	马来西亚	Mǎláixīyà	Ashley Chin	Short-track speed skating	
19	Mongolia	蒙古	Měnggǔ	Achbadrakh Batmunkh	Cross-country skiing	
19	Mongolia	蒙古	Měnggǔ	Gereltuya Battulga	Short-track speed skating	
20	Nepal	尼泊尔	Níbóěr	Saphal Ram Shrestha	Alpine skiing	
20	Nepal	尼泊尔	Níbóěr	Laxmi Rai	Alpine skiing	
21	Pakistan	巴基斯坦	Bājīsītǎn	Muhammad Karim	Alpine skiing	
21	Pakistan	巴基斯坦	Bājīsītǎn	—N/a		
22	Philippines	菲律宾	Fēilǜbīn	Peter Groseclose	Short-track speed skating	
22	Philippines	菲律宾	Fēilǜbīn	Kathleen Dubberstein	Curling	
23	Qatar	卡塔尔	Kǎtǎěr	Mohammed Alnaimi	Curling	
23	Qatar	卡塔尔	Kǎtǎěr	Sara Al-Qaet	Curling	
24	Saudi Arabia	沙特	Shātè	Fayik Abdi	Alpine skiing	
24	Saudi Arabia	沙特	Shātè	Sharifa Al-Sudairi	Alpine skiing	
25	Singapore	新加坡	Xīnjiāpō	Wee Chew	Ice hockey	
25	Singapore	新加坡	Xīnjiāpō	Alyssa Pok	Short-track speed skating	
26	Sri Lanka	斯里兰卡	Sīlǐ Lánkǎ	Sajeev De Silva	Cross-country skiing	
26	Sri Lanka	斯里兰卡	Sīlǐ Lánkǎ	Piumi Piyadarshani	Cross-country skiing	
27	Chinese Taipei	中华台北	Zhōnghuá Táiběi	Lin Chun-chieh	Short-track speed skating	
27	Chinese Taipei	中华台北	Zhōnghuá Táiběi	Lin Yang-chi	Ice hockey	
28	Tajikistan	塔吉克斯坦	Tǎjíkèsītǎn	Ikromiddin Abdullozoda	Alpine skiing	
28	Tajikistan	塔吉克斯坦	Tǎjíkèsītǎn	—N/a		
29	Thailand	泰国	Tàiguó	Thanatip Bunrit	Cross-country skiing	
29	Thailand	泰国	Tàiguó	Teekhree Silpa-Archa	Figure skating	
30	Turkmenistan	土库曼斯坦	Tǔkùmànsītǎn	Dovlet Hydyrov	Ice hockey	
30	Turkmenistan	土库曼斯坦	Tǔkùmànsītǎn	—N/a		
31	United Arab Emirates	阿联酋	Āliánqiú	Sultan Al-Ghandi	Freestyle skiing	
31	United Arab Emirates	阿联酋	Āliánqiú	Amenah Al-Muhairi	Snowboarding	
32	Uzbekistan	乌兹别克斯坦	Wūzībiékèsītǎn	Jasur Shamsiddinov	Ski mountaineering	
32	Uzbekistan	乌兹别克斯坦	Wūzībiékèsītǎn	Feruza Bobokulova	Ski mountaineering	
33	Vietnam	越南	Yuènán	Dương Trường Lập	Short-track speed skating	
33	Vietnam	越南	Yuènán	—N/a		
34	China	中国	Zhōngguó	Ning Zhongyan	Speed skating	
34	China	中国	Zhōngguó	Liu Mengting	Freestyle skiing	
