= Japan at the 2025 Asian Winter Games =

- Flag of Japan
- IOC code: JPN
- NOC: Japanese Olympic Committee

in Harbin, China 7 February 2025 – 14 February 2025
- Competitors: 151 in 11 sports
- Flag bearers: Haruki Watanabe & Yuka Takahashi
- Medals Ranked 3rd: Gold 10 Silver 12 Bronze 15 Total 37

Asian Winter Games appearances
- 1986; 1990; 1996; 1999; 2003; 2007; 2011; 2017; 2025; 2029

Japan competed in the 2025 Asian Winter Games in Harbin, China, from February 7 to 14.

The Japanese team consisted of 151 athletes competing in all 11 sports. During the opening ceremony, curler Haruki Watanabe and speed skater Yuka Takahashi were the country's flagbearers.

== Medal summary ==
=== Medal table ===
Sport	Gold	Silver	Bronze	Total
Freestyle skiing	2	1	1	4
Alpine skiing	2	0	2	4
Figure skating	1	2	3	6
Snowboarding	1	2	2	5
Cross-country skiing	1	2	1	4
Ice hockey	1	1	0	2
Curling	1	0	1	2
Biathlon	1	0	0	1
Speed skating	0	3	3	6
Short-track speed skating	0	1	2	3
Totals (10 entries)	10	12	15	37

=== Medalists ===
Medal	Name	Sport	Event	Date
Gold	Chisaki Maeda	Alpine skiing	Women's slalom	8 February
Gold	Tori Koana; Go Aoki	Curling	Mixed doubles	8 February
Gold	Takayuki Koyama	Alpine skiing	Men's slalom	9 February
Gold	Haruki Yamashita	Cross-country skiing	Men's 10 km freestyle	10 February
Gold	Rai Kasamura	Freestyle skiing	Men's slopestyle	11 February
Gold	Utana Yoshida; Masaya Morita	Figure skating	Ice dance	12 February
Gold	Rai Kasamura	Freestyle skiing	Men's big air	12 February
Gold	Kiyomasa Ojima; Masaharu Yamamoto; Mikito Tachizaki; Tsukasa Kobonoki	Biathlon	Men's relay	13 February
Gold	Sara Shimizu	Snowboarding	Women's halfpipe	13 February
Gold	Riko Kawaguchi; Shiori Koike; Aoi Shiga; Shiori Yamashita; Kohane Sato; Kanami Seki; Akane Hosoyamada; Hikaru Yamashita; Rui Ukita; Yoshino Enomoto; Wakana Kurosu; Suzuka Maeda; Makoto Ito; Haruka Kuromaru; Remi Koyama; Rio Noro; Mei Miura; Riri Noro; Yumeka Wajima; Ai Tada; Miyuu Masuhara	Ice hockey	Women's tournament	14 February
Silver	Kazuya Yamada	Speed skating	Men's 1500 metres	8 February
Silver	Shun Saito; Daito Ochi; Shuta Matsuzu; Tsubasa Furukawa; Osuke Irie; Kota Kikuchi	Short-track speed skating	Men's 5000 metre relay	9 February
Silver	Takatsugu Uda	Cross-country skiing	Men's 10 km freestyle	10 February
Silver	Wataru Morishige	Speed skating	Men's 500 metres	10 February
Silver	Rai Kasamura	Freestyle skiing	Men's slopestyle	11 February
Silver	Rin Kosaka; Yuna Onodera; Yuka Takahashi	Speed skating	Women's team pursuit	11 February
Silver	Shota Moriguchi; Takatsugu Uda; Yuito Habuki; Haruki Yamashita	Cross-country skiing	Men's 4 × 7.5 km relay	12 February
Silver	Kaori Sakamoto	Figure skating	Women's singles	13 February
Silver	Yuma Kagiyama	Figure skating	Men's singles	13 February
Silver	Koyata Kikuchihara	Snowboarding	Men's halfpipe	13 February
Silver	Sena Tomita	Snowboarding	Women's halfpipe	13 February
Silver	Yuta Narisawa; Seiya Hayata; Koki Yoneyama; Jiei Halliday; Kotaro Yamada; Kotaro Tsutsumi; Riku Ishida; Kenta Takagi; Toi Kobayashi; Kosuke Otsu; Hiroto Sato; Masato Okubo; Yuto Osawa; Taiga Irikura; Shigeki Hitosato; Makuru Furuhashi; Shogo Nakajima; Yusei Otsu; Kento Suzuki; Sota Isogai; Kazuki Lawlor; Issa Otsuka; Eiki Sato	Ice hockey	Men's tournament	14 February
Bronze	Eren Watanabe	Alpine skiing	Women's slalom	8 February
Bronze	Tsubasa Furukawa; Riho Inuzuka; Shun Saito; Rina Shimada; Yuki Ishikawa; Kota Kikuchi; Shuta Matsuzu; Miyu Miyashita	Short-track speed skating	Mixed 2000 metre relay	8 February
Bronze	Himari Ishii	Snowboarding	Women's slopestyle	8 February
Bronze	Ryota Kojima	Speed skating	Men's 1500 metres	8 February
Bronze	Neo Kamada	Alpine skiing	Men's slalom	9 February
Bronze	Rina Shimada; Yuki Ishikawa; Haruna Nagamori; Riho Inuzuka; Miyu Miyashita; Kurumi Shimane	Short-track speed skating	Women's 3000 metre relay	9 February
Bronze	Runa Igarashi; Yuta Nakagawa; Haruto Igarashi	Freestyle skiing	Mixed team aerials	10 February
Bronze	Suzuka Ishimoto	Snowboarding	Women's big air	10 February
Bronze	Katsuhiro Kuratsubo; Wataru Morishige; Kazuya Yamada	Speed skating	Men's team sprint	10 February
Bronze	Motonaga Arito; Kotaro Kasahara; Taiyo Morino	Speed skating	Men's team pursuit	11 February
Bronze	Mayu Yamamoto; Chika Kobayashi; Yuka Yamazaki; Karen Hatakeyama	Cross-country skiing	Women's 4 × 5 km relay	12 February
Bronze	Azusa Tanaka; Shingo Nishiyama	Figure skating	Ice dance	12 February
Bronze	Yuna Nagaoka; Sumitada Moriguchi	Figure skating	Pairs	12 February
Bronze	Hana Yoshida	Figure skating	Women's singles	13 February
Bronze	Yuina Miura; Suzune Yasui; Yuna Sakuma; Ai Matsunaga; Hana Ikeda	Curling	Women's tournament	14 February

== Competitors ==
The following table lists the Japanese delegation per sport and gender.

Sport	Men	Women	Total
Alpine skiing	4	4	8
Biathlon	5	5	10
Cross-country skiing	5	4	9
Curling	6	6	12
Figure skating	6	6	12
Freestyle skiing	6	4	10
Ice hockey	23	21	44
Short-track speed skating	6	6	12
Ski mountaineering	3	3	6
Snowboarding	4	6	10
Speed skating	10	8	18
Total	78	73	151

== Alpine skiing ==
Japan entered eight alpine skiers (four per gender).

Men

Athlete	Event	Run 1		Run 2		Total	
Athlete	Event	Time	Rank	Time	Rank	Time	Rank
Neo Kamada	Slalom	44.74	1	44.51	4	1:29.25	3rd place, bronze medalist(s)
Jinro Kirikubo	Slalom	DNF					
Takayuki Koyama	Slalom	44.83	2	43.29	1	1:28.12	1st place, gold medalist(s)
Arata Yamanaka	Slalom	45.20	5	DSQ			

Women

Athlete	Event	Run 1		Run 2		Total	
Athlete	Event	Time	Rank	Time	Rank	Time	Rank
Miki Ishibashi	Slalom	DNS					
Chisaki Maeda	Slalom	47.29	1	46.21	1	1:33.50	1st place, gold medalist(s)
Maria Sakai	Slalom	49.22	6	48.91	5	1:38.13	5
Eren Watanabe	Slalom	48.00	3	46.92	3	1:34.92	3rd place, bronze medalist(s)

== Biathlon ==
Men

Athlete	Event	Time	Misses	Rank
Masaharu Yamamoto	Sprint	30:39.8	3 (0+3)	5
Kiyomasa Ojima	Sprint	31:09.1	5 (2+3)	8
Tsukasa Kobonoki	Sprint	31:27.9	5 (2+3)	9
Mikito Tachizaki	Sprint	Did not start		
Kiyomasa Ojima; Mikito Tachizaki; Masaharu Yamamoto; Tsukasa Kobonoki	Relay	1:24:20.3	3+14	1st place, gold medalist(s)

Women

Athlete	Event	Time	Misses	Rank
Aoi Sato	Sprint	23:50.3	2 (1+1)	8
Mikoto Takeuchi	Sprint	24:43.2	1 (1+0)	12
Hikaru Fukuda	Sprint	26:05.8	3 (2+1)	15
Kanaha Iwasa	Sprint	27:09.1	4 (2+2)	17
Aoi Sato; Mikoto Takeuchi; Hikaru Fukuda; Misa Sasaki	Relay	1:35:06.8	3+19	4

== Cross-country skiing ==
Distance
Men

Athlete	Event	Total		
Athlete	Event	Time	Deficit	Rank
Haruki Yamashita	10 km freestyle	21:06.5	-	1st place, gold medalist(s)
Takatsugu Uda	10 km freestyle	21:16.5	+10.0	2nd place, silver medalist(s)
Yuito Habuki	10 km freestyle	22:01.3	+54.8	8
Hyuga Otaki	10 km freestyle	DNS		
Shota Moriguchi; Takatsugu Uda; Yuito Habuki; Haruki Yamashita	4 × 7.5 km relay	1:12:12.8	+3.2	2nd place, silver medalist(s)

Women

Athlete	Event	Total		
Athlete	Event	Time	Deficit	Rank
Chika Kobayashi	5 km freestyle	12:32.1	+25.6	6
Yuka Yamazaki	5 km freestyle	13:06.2	+58.7	10
Karen Hatakeyama	5 km freestyle	13:42.6	+1:35.1	14
Mayu Yamamoto	5 km freestyle	13:48.9	+1:41.4	17
Mayu Yamamoto; Chika Kobayashi; Yuka Yamazaki; Karen Hatakeyama	4 × 5 km relay	56:38.1	+2:38.8	3rd place, bronze medalist(s)

Sprint
Men

Athlete	Event	Qualification		Quarterfinals		Semifinals		Final	
Athlete	Event	Time	Rank	Time	Rank	Time	Rank	Time	Rank
Hyuga Otaki	Sprint classical	3:04.05	4 Q	3:05.68	1 Q	2:58.97	4 q	3:04.84	5
Haruki Yamashita	Sprint classical	3:05.11	6 Q	3:06.29	1 Q	2:58.10	2 Q	Disqualified	
Takatsugu Uda	Sprint classical	3:11.05	10 Q	3:06.52	2 Q	3:02.53	5	Did not advance	
Shota Moriguchi	Sprint classical	3:18.14	16 Q	3:06.67	3 q	3:04.84	6	Did not advance	

Women

Athlete	Event	Qualification		Quarterfinals		Semifinals		Final	
Athlete	Event	Time	Rank	Time	Rank	Time	Rank	Time	Rank
Chika Kobayashi	Sprint classical	3:44.05	6 Q	3:43.18	2 Q	3:36.42	4	Did not advance	
Yuka Yamazaki	Sprint classical	3:53.76	10 Q	3:41.56	3 q	3:51.94	6	Did not advance	
Mayu Yamamoto	Sprint classical	4:06.72	16 Q	3:53.76	3	Did not advance			

== Curling ==
Summary

Team	Event	Group stage									Qualification	Semifinal	Final / BM	
Team	Event	Opposition Score	Opposition Score	Opposition Score	Opposition Score	Opposition Score	Opposition Score	Opposition Score	Opposition Score	Rank	Opposition Score	Opposition Score	Opposition Score	Rank
Ryo Aoki; Haruki Watanabe; Ayumu Hemmi; Osuke Miya; Rin Kyotoh	Men's team	Thailand; W 23–0	Qatar; W 12–2	Hong Kong; L 3–7	Saudi Arabia; W 9–4	China; L 5–8	—N/a			3 Q	Philippines; L 4–10	Did not advance		5
Yuina Miura; Suzune Yasui; Yuna Sakuma; Ai Matsunaga; Hana Ikeda	Women's team	Kazakhstan; W 10–4	South Korea; L 4–6	Philippines; W 6–4	Qatar; W 12–1	Thailand; W 13–2	Hong Kong; W 9–2	Chinese Taipei; W 12–5	China; L 2–6	3 Q	—N/a	China; L 2–5	Kazakhstan; W 6–3	3rd place, bronze medalist(s)
Tori Koana; Go Aoki	Mixed doubles	Thailand; W 12–2	Mongolia; W 19–0	Hong Kong; W 9–3	Chinese Taipei; W 9–3	Kuwait; W	—N/a			1 Q	Bye	Philippines; W 10–3	South Korea; W 7–6	1st place, gold medalist(s)

=== Men's tournament ===
Japan entered a men's team.

Round robin

Group B	Skip	W	L	W–L	PF	PA	EW	EL	BE	SE	DSC
China	Xu Xiaoming	5	0	–	53	10	23	8	0	13	36.46
Hong Kong	Jason Chang	4	1	–	50	16	21	9	1	14	62.23
Japan	Ryo Aoki	3	2	–	52	21	19	13	3	7	63.73
Qatar	Mubarak Al-Marri	2	3	–	21	41	14	19	0	5	138.50
Saudi Arabia	Suleiman Alaqel	1	4	–	22	55	12	21	0	3	128.47
Thailand	Pongsak Mahattanasakul	0	5	–	8	73	7	26	0	1	130.14

Draw 1

Sunday, 9 February, 13:00

Sheet B	1	2	3	4	5	6	7	8	Final
Thailand (Mahattanasakul)	0	0	0	0	0	0	X	X	0
Japan (Aoki)	3	5	3	4	3	5	X	X	23

Draw 2

Sunday, 9 February, 21:00

Sheet C	1	2	3	4	5	6	7	8	Final
Japan (Aoki)	2	2	0	4	0	4	X	X	12
Qatar (Al-Marri)	0	0	1	0	1	0	X	X	2

Draw 4

Monday, 10 February, 14:00

Sheet D	1	2	3	4	5	6	7	8	Final
Hong Kong (Chang)	0	0	2	1	0	0	1	3	7
Japan (Aoki)	0	1	0	0	0	2	0	0	3

Draw 6

Tuesday, 11 February, 14:00

Sheet E	1	2	3	4	5	6	7	8	Final
Saudi Arabia (Alaqel)	1	0	2	0	1	0	0	X	4
Japan (Aoki)	0	4	0	1	0	3	1	X	9

Draw 9

Wednesday, 12 February, 19:00

Sheet A	1	2	3	4	5	6	7	8	Final
Japan (Aoki)	2	0	0	2	0	1	0	0	5
China (Xu)	0	1	0	0	2	0	2	3	8

Qualification

Thursday, 13 February, 14:00

Sheet B	1	2	3	4	5	6	7	8	Final
Philippines (Pfister)	0	2	0	2	0	2	4	X	10
Japan (Aoki)	1	0	2	0	1	0	0	X	4

=== Women's tournament ===
Japan entered a women's team.

Round robin

Team	Skip	W	L	W–L	PF	PA	EW	EL	BE	SE	DSC
South Korea	Gim Eun-ji	8	0	–	63	14	33	11	0	18	45.90
China	Wang Rui	7	1	–	85	21	34	17	3	18	38.69
Japan	Yuina Miura	6	2	–	68	30	32	19	2	14	58.25
Kazakhstan	Angelina Ebauyer	5	3	–	55	39	28	22	1	14	54.81
Philippines	Kathleen Dubberstein	4	4	–	61	36	32	21	1	16	85.56
Hong Kong	Ling-Yue Hung	3	5	–	44	45	24	29	1	11	115.69
Chinese Taipei	Yang Ko	2	6	–	29	75	16	34	1	4	107.27
Thailand	Kanya Natchanarong	1	7	–	19	91	15	30	0	7	128.48
Qatar	Sara Al-Qaet	0	8	–	11	84	8	33	1	5	180.65

Draw 1

Sunday, 9 February, 9:00

Sheet D	1	2	3	4	5	6	7	8	Final
Kazakhstan (Ebauyer)	0	2	0	1	0	1	0	X	4
Japan (Miura)	3	0	3	0	3	0	1	X	10

Draw 2

Sunday, 9 February, 17:00

Sheet B	1	2	3	4	5	6	7	8	Final
South Korea (Gim)	1	0	0	2	1	0	2	X	6
Japan (Miura)	0	0	1	0	0	3	0	X	4

Draw 3

Monday, 10 February, 9:00

Sheet A	1	2	3	4	5	6	7	8	Final
Japan (Miura)	1	0	0	2	1	1	1	X	6
Philippines (Dubberstein)	0	2	2	0	0	0	0	X	4

Draw 4

Monday, 10 February, 19:00

Sheet D	1	2	3	4	5	6	7	8	Final
Japan (Miura)	2	1	0	3	5	1	X	X	12
Qatar (Al-Qaet)	0	0	1	0	0	0	X	X	1

Draw 5

Tuesday, 11 February, 9:00

Sheet C	1	2	3	4	5	6	7	8	Final
Thailand (Natchanarong)	0	1	0	0	1	0	X	X	2
Japan (Miura)	4	0	2	4	0	3	X	X	13

Draw 6

Tuesday, 11 February, 19:00

Sheet E	1	2	3	4	5	6	7	8	Final
Hong Kong (Hung)	0	0	0	0	2	0	0	X	2
Japan (Miura)	2	1	1	2	0	1	2	X	9

Draw 8

Wednesday, 12 February, 19:00

Sheet B	1	2	3	4	5	6	7	8	Final
Japan (Miura)	5	1	0	2	0	0	4	X	12
Chinese Taipei (Yang)	0	0	1	0	4	0	0	X	5

Draw 9

Thursday, 13 February, 9:00

Sheet C	1	2	3	4	5	6	7	8	Final
Japan (Miura)	0	1	0	0	0	1	0	0	2
China (Wang)	0	0	0	1	2	0	2	1	6

Semifinal

Thursday, 13 February, 19:00

Sheet B	1	2	3	4	5	6	7	8	Final
China (Wang)	1	0	0	1	0	1	2	X	5
Japan (Miura)	0	0	0	0	2	0	0	X	2

Bronze Medal Game

Friday, 14 February, 13:00

Sheet B	1	2	3	4	5	6	7	8	Final
Kazakhstan (Ebauyer)	0	0	0	2	0	0	1	X	3
Japan (Miura)	0	1	1	0	3	1	0	X	6

=== Mixed doubles tournament ===
Japan entered a mixed doubles pair.

Round robin

Pos	Team	Athletes	Pld	W	L	W–L	PF	PA	DSC	Qualification
1	Japan	Koana / Aoki	5	5	0	—	49	8	57.23	Semifinals
2	Hong Kong	Hung / Yan	5	4	1	—	46	26	56.68	Qualification
3	Chinese Taipei	Chou / Liu	5	3	2	—	44	25	65.56	Qualification
4	Thailand	Sonkham / Jearateerawit	5	2	3	—	29	46	142.12	
5	Kuwait	Abdulateef / Al-Kandari	5	1	4	—	14	41	197.23	
6	Mongolia	Enkhzayaa / Bayar	5	0	5	—	16	52	134.74	

Source: Official website

Draw 1

Tuesday, 4 February, 10:00

Sheet E	1	2	3	4	5	6	7	8	Final
Japan (Koana / Aoki)	0	3	2	2	0	3	2	X	12
Thailand (Sonkham / Jearateerawit)	1	0	0	0	1	0	0	X	2

Draw 2

Tuesday, 4 February, 14:00

Sheet D	1	2	3	4	5	6	7	8	Final
Mongolia (Ganbat / Bulgankhuu)	0	0	0	0	0	0	X	X	0
Japan (Koana / Aoki)	5	4	1	3	5	1	X	X	19

Draw 3

Wednesday, 5 February, 10:00

Sheet B	1	2	3	4	5	6	7	8	Final
Japan (Koana / Aoki)	1	1	2	1	1	0	3	X	9
Hong Kong (Hung / Yan)	0	0	0	0	0	3	0	X	3

Draw 6

Thursday, 6 February, 10:00

Sheet A	1	2	3	4	5	6	7	8	Final
Chinese Taipei (Chou / Liu)	1	0	0	0	0	2	X	X	3
Japan (Koana / Aoki)	0	2	2	2	3	0	X	X	9

Draw 7

Thursday, 6 February, 14:00

Sheet C	1	2	3	4	5	6	7	8	Final
Japan (Koana / Aoki)	5	5							W
Kuwait (Abdulateef / Alkandari)	0	0							L

- Kuwait forfeited the game after end 2 as a player was feeling unwell and could not continue to play.

Semifinal

Friday, 7 February, 13:00

Sheet B	1	2	3	4	5	6	7	8	Final
Philippines (Dubberstein / Pfister)	0	2	0	0	1	0	X	X	3
Japan (Koana / Aoki)	2	0	4	1	0	3	X	X	10

Gold medal game

Saturday, 8 February, 9:00

Sheet C	1	2	3	4	5	6	7	8	Final
Japan (Koana / Aoki)	0	2	0	2	1	0	0	2	7
South Korea (Kim / Seong)	2	0	1	0	0	1	2	0	6

== Figure skating ==
Japan entered 12 figure skaters (six per gender).

Singles

Athlete(s)	Event	SP		FS		Total	
Athlete(s)	Event	Points	Rank	Points	Rank	Points	Rank
Yuma Kagiyama	Men's	103.81	1	168.95	3	272.76	2nd place, silver medalist(s)
Shun Sato	Men's	70.02	5	162.08	4	232.10	5
Kaori Sakamoto	Women's	75.03	2	136.87	2	211.90	2nd place, silver medalist(s)
Hana Yoshida	Women's	68.76	3	136.44	3	205.20	3rd place, bronze medalist(s)

Mixed

Athlete(s)	Event	SP/RD		FS/FD		Total	
Athlete(s)	Event	Points	Rank	Points	Rank	Points	Rank
Sumitada Moriguchi; Yuna Nagaoka	Pairs	58.49	2	109.86	3	168.35	3rd place, bronze medalist(s)
Lucas Tsuyoshi Honda; Sae Shimizu	Pairs	45.69	6	89.89	6	135.58	6
Masaya Morita; Utana Yoshida	Ice dance	68.88	1	104.43	2	173.31	1st place, gold medalist(s)
Shingo Nishiyama; Azusa Tanaka	Ice dance	63.21	3	100.50	3	163.71	3rd place, bronze medalist(s)

== Freestyle skiing ==
Aerials
Men

Athlete	Event	Final 1				Final 2			
Athlete	Event	Run 1	Run 2	Best	Rank	Run 1	Run 2	Best	Rank
Haruto Igarashi	Aerials	77.49	72.96	77.49	7	—N/a		Did not advance	
Haruto Igarashi; Yuta Nakagawa	Synchro aerials	—N/a				55.96	55.10	55.96	5

Women

Athlete	Event	Final 1				Final 2			
Athlete	Event	Run 1	Run 2	Best	Rank	Run 1	Run 2	Best	Rank
Runa Igarashi	Aerials	37.18	45.30	45.30	6 Q	—N/a		52.00	6

Mixed

Athlete	Event	Final	
Athlete	Event	Best	Rank
Runa Igarashi; Yuta Nakagawa; Haruto Igarashi	Aerials	191.28	3rd place, bronze medalist(s)

Half pipe, Slopestyle and Big Air
Men

Athlete	Event	Final				
Athlete	Event	Run 1	Run 2	Run 3	Best	Rank
Rai Kasamura	Big air	93.50	90.00	DNI	183.50	1st place, gold medalist(s)
Ruka Ito	Big air	81.75	78.25	DNI	160.00	4
Toma Matsuura	Halfpipe	50.00	87.25	DNI	87.25	4
Kashu Sato	Halfpipe	58.00	68.50	71.00	71.00	8
Rai Kasamura	Slopestyle	90.00	93.25	DNI	93.25	1st place, gold medalist(s)
Ruka Ito	Slopestyle	81.75	88.50	DNI	88.50	2nd place, silver medalist(s)

Women

Athlete	Event	Final				
Athlete	Event	Run 1	Run 2	Run 3	Best	Rank
Kiho Sugawara	Big air	75.75	79.00	DNI	154.75	4
Kanon Kondo	Big air	68.00	66.75	DNI	134.75	5
Kiho Sugawara	Slopestyle	75.50	81.75	DNI	81.75	4
Kanon Kondo	Slopestyle	70.00	72.00	DNI	72.00	5

== Ice hockey ==
=== Men's tournament ===
Japan qualified a men's hockey team. The Japanese team qualified after being ranked as one of the top 12 teams in Asia on the IIHF World Ranking as of May 2024.

Japan was represented by the following 23 athletes:

- Makuru Furuhashi (F)
- Jiei Halliday (D)
- Seiya Hayata (D)
- Shigeki Hitosato (F)
- Taiga Irikura (F)
- Riku Ishida (D)
- Sota Isogai (F)
- Toi Kobayashi (F)
- Kazuki Lawlor (D)
- Shogo Nakajima (F)
- Yuta Narisawa (G)
- Masato Okubo (F)
- Yuto Osawa (F)
- Kosuke Otsu (F)
- Yusei Otsu (D)
- Issa Otsuka (G)
- Eiki Sato (G)
- Hiroto Sato (D)
- Kento Suzuki (F)
- Kenta Takagi (F)
- Kotaro Tsutsumi (F)
- Kotaro Yamada (D)
- Koki Yoneyama (D)

Legend: G = Goalie, D = Defense, F = Forward

Group stage

Pos	Team	Pld	W	OW	OL	L	GF	GA	GD	Pts	Qualification
1	Kazakhstan	5	5	0	0	0	41	3	+38	15	Quarterfinals
2	South Korea	5	3	1	0	1	36	10	+26	11	Quarterfinals
3	Japan	5	3	0	0	2	28	11	+17	9	Quarterfinals
4	China	5	2	0	1	2	20	14	+6	7	Quarterfinals
5	Chinese Taipei	5	1	0	0	4	4	52	−48	3	Quarterfinals
6	Thailand	5	0	0	0	5	2	41	−39	0	Quarterfinals

Source: OCA

4 February; 12:00	Chinese Taipei	0–15 (0–4, 0–8, 0–3)	Japan	Harbin Ice Hockey Arena, Harbin; Attendance: 2,913

Game reference

Lee Yi-cheng
Goalies
Eiki Sato
Referees:
Chae Young-jin (KOR)
Timur Morev (KAZ)

0–1	06:19 – Hitosato (K. Otsu)
0–2	08:12 – Suzuki (Irikura, Y. Otsu)
0–3	19:30 – Yoneyama (K. Otsu, Osawa)
0–4	19:53 – Hitosato
0–5	22:43 – Halliday (Hitosato, K. Otsu)
0–6	24:23 – Isogai (Y. Otsu, Irikura)
0–7	26:59 – Suzuki (Y. Otsu, Irikura)
0–8	27:37 – Isogai (Y. Otsu)
0–9	29:01 – K. Otsu (Yoneyama, Hitosato)
0–10	31:37 – Lawlor (Tsutsumi, Yoneyama)
0–11	31:57 – Furuhashi (Kobayashi)
0–12	37:08 – Yoneyama (Hitosato, Kobayashi) (PP)
0–13	50:59 – Okubo (Hitosato, Kobayashi)
0–14	55:19 – Suzuki (Isogai, Irikura)
0–15	57:26 – Irikura (Suzuki, H. Sato) (PP2)

10 min
Penalties
6 min
13
Shots
61

5 February; 12:00	Japan	8–1 (1–0, 4–0, 3–1)	Thailand	Harbin Ice Hockey Arena, Harbin; Attendance: 715

Game reference

Issa Otsuka
Goalies
Dominik Vollenweider
Referees:
Shen Yen-chin (TPE)
Wang Gongbo (CHN)

Isogai (Lawlor, Irikura) – 09:21	1–0
Yoneyama (Hitosato, Isogai) (PP) – 25:29	2–0
Yamada (Osawa, Lawlor) (SH) – 27:00	3–0
Furuhashi (Kobayashi) – 39:05	4–0
Takagi (Halliday, H. Sato) – 39:43	5–0
Yamada (Isogai, Irikura) – 44:17	6–0
Suzuki (Isogai, H. Sato) – 50:06	7–0
	7–1	54:15 – Aarola (PP)
Okubo (K. Otsu, Halliday) – 54:33	8–1

8 min
Penalties
6 min
76
Shots
13

7 February; 12:30	South Korea	5–2 (1–1, 3–1, 1–0)	Japan	Harbin Sport University Stadium, Harbin; Attendance: 1,044

Game reference

Lee Yeon-seung
Goalies
Yuta Narisawa
Referees:
Konstantin Chubenko (KAZ)
Liu Jiaqi (CHN)

	0–1	02:25 – Okubo (Kobayashi, H. Sato) (PP)
Lee C. (Ahn, Kim S.W.) – 06:06	1–1
Kim S.W. (Ahn, Lee C.) – 20:27	2–1
	2–2	21:57 – Irikura (Suzuki, Isogai)
Kim S.Y. (Lee H., Lee S.) – 27:24	3–2
Kim S.W. (Lee S., Lee C.) – 36:41	4–2
Kang Y. (Oh, Lee C.) – 58:32	5–2

6 min
Penalties
4 min
29
Shots
31

8 February; 12:00	Japan	1–4 (1–1, 0–2, 0–1)	Kazakhstan	Harbin Ice Hockey Arena, Harbin; Attendance: 2,709

Game reference

Yuta Narisawa
Goalies
Andrey Shutov
Referees:
Chae Young-jin (KOR)
Wang Gongbo (CHN)

Okubo (Y. Otsu, Tsutsumi) – 01:28	1–0
	1–1	15:00 – Borissevich (Ospanov, Buyalskiy)
	1–2	31:58 – Beketayev (Savitskiy, Kolesnikov) (PP)
	1–3	35:15 – Rymarev (Beketayev, Starchenko) (PP)
	1–4	45:19 – Starchenko (Rymarev, Omirbekov)

8 min
Penalties
2 min
19
Shots
23

10 February; 20:00	Japan	2–1 (0–1, 1–0, 1–0)	China	Harbin Ice Hockey Arena, Harbin; Attendance: 3,288

Game reference

Yuta Narisawa
Goalies
Chen Shifeng
Referees:
Konstantin Chubenko (KAZ)
Timur Morev (KAZ)

	0–1	01:36 – Hou (Han)
Ishida (H. Sato, Kobayashi) (PP) – 34:09	1–1
Takagi (Ishida) – 51:30	2–1

10 min
Penalties
10 min
37
Shots
21

Quarterfinals

11 February; 20:00	Japan	15–2 (3–1, 6–1, 6–0)	Thailand	Harbin Sport University Stadium, Harbin; Attendance: 1,163

Game reference

Eiki Sato
Issa Otsuka
Goalies
Ben Kleineschay
Referees:
Li Ho Ching (HKG)
Liu Jiaqi (CHN)

Kobayashi (Nakajima) – 03:36	1–0
Suzuki (Kobayashi, Yoneyama) – 14:12	2–0
Osawa (Yamada, Ishida) – 18:54	3–0
	3–1	19:34 – Aarola (Lampson, Kindborn)
K. Otsu (Takagi, Hayata) – 22:26	4–1
Nakajima (Hayata, Yoneyama) – 26:23	5–1
	5–2	28:35 – Forstner (Lampson)
Irikura (Hitosato, Yoneyama) (PP) – 32:41	6–2
Isogai (Hitosato, Yoneyama) (PP) – 33:07	7–2
Kobayashi (Suzuki, Hayata) – 35:51	8–2
Irikura (Hitosato, Hayata) – 38:32	9–2
Yamada (Isogai, Irikura) – 40:22	10–2
Takagi (K. Otsu, Osawa) – 41:56	11–2
Kobayashi (Yoneyama, Nakajima) – 43:54	12–2
Hayata (Nakajima) – 44:07	13–2
Halliday – 44:56	14–2
K. Otsu (Osawa, Yoneyama) – 50:13	15–2

10 min
Penalties
12 min
79
Shots
10

Semifinals

13 February; 14:00	South Korea	3–4 GWS (2–1, 1–1, 0–1) (OT: 0–0) (SO: 0–1)	Japan	Harbin Ice Hockey Arena, Harbin; Attendance: 2,582

Game reference

Lee Yeon-seung
Goalies
Yuta Narisawa
Referees:
Konstantin Chubenko (KAZ)
Anton Boryayev (KAZ)

Ahn (Kim S.W., Kim W.) – 03:12	1–0
Kim S.Y. (Kang M., Kong) (PP) – 14:25	2–0
	2–1	19:21 – Kobayashi (Nakajima, Suzuki)
Kim S.H. – 25:29	3–1
	3–2	28:05 – Isogai (Yoneyama, Nakajima) (PP)
	3–3	58:45 – Nakajima (Yoneyama, H. Sato)

Ahn (miss)
Kim S.W. (miss)
Kong (miss)
Shootout
Takagi
(miss) Kobayashi
(miss) Irikura
Suzuki
8 min
Penalties
10 min
32
Shots
29

Gold medal match

14 February; 14:00	Kazakhstan	5–0 (1–0, 2–0, 2–0)	Japan	Harbin Ice Hockey Arena, Harbin; Attendance: 2,952

Game reference

Andrey Shutov
Goalies
Yuta Narisawa
Referees:
Chae Young-jin (KOR)
Konstantin Chubenko (KAZ)

Buyalskiy (Daniyar) – 17:34	1–0
Breus (Likhotnikov, Gaitamirov) – 21:02	2–0
Starchenko (Beketayev, Omirbekov) (PP) – 37:59	3–0
Panyukov (Starchenko, Rymarev) (PP) – 42:24	4–0
Panyukov – 44:23	5–0

4 min
Penalties
12 min
26
Shots
13

=== Women's tournament ===
Japan qualified a women's hockey team. The Japanese team qualified after being ranked as one of the top eight teams in Asia on the IIHF World Ranking as of May 2024.

Japan was represented by the following 21 athletes:

- Yoshino Enomoto (F)
- Akane Hosoyamada (D)
- Makoto Ito (F)
- Riko Kawaguchi (G)
- Shiori Koike (D)
- Remi Koyama (F)
- Haruka Kuromaru (G)
- Wakana Kurosu (F)
- Suzuka Maeda (F)
- Miyuu Masuhara (G)
- Mei Miura (F)
- Rio Noro (F)
- Riri Noro (F)
- Kohane Sato (D)
- Kanami Seki (D)
- Aoi Shiga (D)
- Ai Tada (F)
- Rui Ukita (F)
- Yumeka Wajima (F)
- Hikaru Yamashita (F)
- Shiori Yamashita (D)

Legend: G = Goalie, D = Defense, F = Forward

Final round

Pos	Team	Pld	W	OW	OL	L	GF	GA	GD	Pts
1	Japan	3	3	0	0	0	18	1	+17	9
2	Kazakhstan	3	2	0	0	1	5	5	0	6
3	China	3	1	0	0	2	4	11	−7	3
4	South Korea	3	0	0	0	3	1	11	−10	0

Source: OCA

12 February; 10:00	Kazakhstan	0–4 (0–1, 0–1, 0–2)	Japan	Harbin Sport University Stadium, Harbin; Attendance: 1,031

Game reference

Arina Chshyokolova
Goalies
Riko Kawaguchi
Referees:
Lee Kyung-sun (KOR)
Song Meina (CHN)

0–1	16:26 – Enomoto (H. Yamashita, Wajima)
0–2	20:17 – Rir. Noro (Shiga, Ukita)
0–3	42:57 – Wajima (Ukita, Sato)
0–4	48:10 – Ito (Shiga, Sato)

4 min
Penalties
2 min
7
Shots
41

13 February; 10:00	Japan	6–0 (3–0, 2–0, 1–0)	South Korea	Harbin Sport University Stadium, Harbin; Attendance: 979

Game reference

Haruka Kuromaru
Goalies
Kim Yeon-ju
Park Jong-ju
Referees:
Liu Lu (CHN)
Song Meina (CHN)

Ukita (Sato) – 10:47	1–0
Ukita (Koyama, Ito) – 15:12	2–0
Wajima (Ito, Hosoyamada) – 18:17	3–0
Maeda (Wajima, Koike) – 24:49	4–0
Wajima (Maeda, Koike) – 32:40	5–0
Maeda (Miura, Koike) – 53:44	6–0

4 min
Penalties
2 min
45
Shots
9

14 February; 14:00	Japan	8–1 (3–1, 2–0, 3–0)	China	Harbin Sport University Stadium, Harbin; Attendance: 1,198

Game reference

Miyuu Masuhara
Goalies
Lai Guimin
Wang Yuqing
Referees:
Liu Lu (CHN)
Miyuki Nakayama (JPN)

Koyama (Ito) – 02:51	1–0
	1–1	06:59 – Kong (Yu) (PP)
Shiga (Ukita, Koyama) – 08:10	2–1
Ito (Ukita) (PP) – 16:42	3–1
Maeda (Koike, Hosoyamada) – 30:01	4–1
Koyama (Koike, Hosoyamada) (PP) – 32:10	5–1
Miura (Ukita) – 40:34	6–1
Ukita (Miura, Ito) – 42:40	7–1
H. Yamashita – 46:07	8–1

6 min
Penalties
8 min
40
Shots
13

== Short-track speed skating ==
Men

Athlete	Event	Heat		Quarterfinal		Semifinal		Final	
Athlete	Event	Time	Rank	Time	Rank	Time	Rank	Time	Rank
Kota Kikuchi	500 m	42.896	2 Q	43.996	5	Did not advance			
Tsubasa Furukawa	500 m	41.905	2 Q	42.601	4	Did not advance			
Shuta Matsuzu	500 m	42.129	2 Q	41.615	2 Q	41.178	4 FB	PEN	9
Kota Kikuchi	1000 m	1:29.629	2 Q	1:29.621	4	Did not advance			
Shuta Matsuzu	1000 m	1:26.845	2 Q	1:26.540	1 Q	1:26.889	4 ADVA	1:29.959	4
Daito Ochi	1000 m	1:34.998	2 Q	1:27.475	3 q	1:26.398	4 FB	1:33.681	7
Osuke Irie	1500 m	—N/a		PEN		Did not advance			
Daito Ochi	1500 m	—N/a		2:30.136	3 Q	2:26.370	4 FB	2:29.643	9
Shun Saito	1500 m	—N/a		2:16.933	3 Q	2:32.006	4 FB	2:29.744	10
Shun Saito; Daito Ochi; Shuta Matsuzu; Tsubasa Furukawa; Osuke Irie^{[a]} Kota Kikuchi^{[a]}	5000 m relay	—N/a				7:14.926	2 FA	7:03.010	2nd place, silver medalist(s)

Women

Athlete	Event	Heat		Quarterfinal		Semifinal		Final	
Athlete	Event	Time	Rank	Time	Rank	Time	Rank	Time	Rank
Rina Shimada	500 m	44.106	2 Q	44.873	2 Q	43.931	2 FA	44.223	5
Yuki Ishikawa	500 m	44.860	4 q	44.045	3 q	44.932	5 FB	44.875	7
Haruna Nagamori	500 m	45.103	3 Q	45.899	4	Did not advance			
Miyu Miyashita	1000 m	1:41.331	3 Q	1:33.460	4	Did not advance			
Rina Shimada	1000 m	1:35.423	3 Q	1:57.083	3	Did not advance			
Kurumi Shimane	1000 m	1:35.345	3 Q	1:35.015	2 Q	1:31.718	3 FB	1:36.951	8
Haruna Nagamori	1500 m	—N/a		2:31.191	2 Q	2:43.225	2 FA	2:25.772	6
Miyu Miyashita	1500 m	—N/a		2:36.513	4 q	2:34.405	4 FB	2:40.708	11
Riho Inuzuka	1500 m	—N/a		2:35.544	3 Q	PEN		Did not advance	
Rina Shimada; Yuki Ishikawa; Haruna Nagamori; Riho Inuzuka; Miyu Miyashita^{[a]} Kurumi Shimane^{[a]}	3000 m relay	—N/a				4:26.093	2 FA	4:13.578	3rd place, bronze medalist(s)

Mixed

Athlete	Event	Quarterfinal		Semifinal		Final	
Athlete	Event	Time	Rank	Time	Rank	Time	Rank
Rina Shimada; Riho Inuzuka; Shun Saito; Tsubasa Furukawa; Yuki Ishikawa^{[a]} Shuta Matsuzu^{[a]} Miyu Miyashita^{[a]} Kota Kikuchi^{[a]}	2000 m relay	2:46.930	2 Q	2:44.956	2 FA	2:44.058	3rd place, bronze medalist(s)

Qualification legend: FA - Qualify to medal final; FB - Qualify to consolation final ^{a} Skaters who participated in the heats only.

== Ski mountaineering ==
Japan entered six ski mountaineers (three per gender).

Athlete	Event	Qualification		Semifinals		Final	
Athlete	Event	Time	Rank	Time	Rank	Time	Rank
Kenta Endo	Men's sprint	3:09.51	7 Q	2:45.80	4 q	2:52.76	6
Ari Hirabayashi	Men's sprint	2:54.72	6 Q	2:42.45	3 q	2:47.07	5
Tokutaro Shima	Men's sprint	3:40.07	14	Did not advance			
Sora Takizawa	Women's sprint	3:36.74	5 Q	3:23.83	3 q	3:28.98	6
Yurie Tanaka	Women's sprint	3:41.19	7 Q	3:26.62	3 q	3:22.59	5
Natsumi Usui	Women's sprint	3:39.97	6 Q	3:39.62	4	Did not advance	
Kenta Endo; Natsumi Usui	Mixed relay	15:34.41	6 Q	—N/a		31:03.01	6
Ari Hirabayashi; Sora Takizawa	Mixed relay	15:03.70	5 Q	—N/a		30:26.66	5
Tokutaro Shima; Yurie Tanaka	Mixed relay	14:08.39	1 Q	—N/a		29:36.29	4

== Snowboarding ==
Japan entered ten snowboarders (four men and six women).

Men

Athlete	Event	Qualification				Final				
Athlete	Event	Run 1	Run 2	Best	Rank	Run 1	Run 2	Run 3	Best	Rank
Hanato Minamiya	Big air	—N/a				41.50	78.00	73.00	151.00	5
Koyata Kikuchihara	Halfpipe	69.75	75.00	75.00	2nd place, silver medalist(s)	Cancelled				
Konosuke Murakami	Halfpipe	24.50	64.75	64.75	4	Cancelled				
Shuichiro Shigeno	Halfpipe	12.50	DNS	12.50	9	Cancelled				
Hanato Minamiya	Slopestyle	72.25	DNI	72.25	4 Q	13.75	70.00	DNI	70.00	5

Women

Athlete	Event	Qualification				Final				
Athlete	Event	Run 1	Run 2	Best	Rank	Run 1	Run 2	Run 3	Best	Rank
Suzuka Ishimoto	Big air	—N/a				72.75	43.25	61.75	134.50	3rd place, bronze medalist(s)
Kiara Morii	Big air	—N/a				Did not start				
Sara Shimizu	Halfpipe	88.50	98.00	98.00	1st place, gold medalist(s)	Cancelled				
Sena Tomita	Halfpipe	90.50	93.75	93.75	2nd place, silver medalist(s)	Cancelled				
Rise Kudo	Halfpipe	21.75	26.25	26.25	10	Cancelled				
Himari Ishii	Slopestyle	—N/a				54.75	61.50	69.50	69.50	3rd place, bronze medalist(s)
Suzuka Ishimoto	Slopestyle	—N/a				59.50	DNI	DNI	59.50	4

== Speed skating ==
Japan entered 18 speed skaters (ten men and eight women).

Men

Athlete	Event	Time	Rank
Katsuhiro Kuratsubo	100 m	9.82	10
Yamato Matsui	100 m	9.80 (4)	8
Wataru Morishige	100 m	9.67	5
Ryota Kojima	500 m	35.155	5
Katsuhiro Kuratsubo	500 m	35.19	6
Yamato Matsui	500 m	35.73	13
Wataru Morishige	500 m	34.97	2nd place, silver medalist(s)
Ryota Kojima	1000 m	1:09.70	4
Yamato Matsui	1000 m	1:12.61	15
Kazuya Yamada	1000 m	1:09.96	5
Masaya Yamada	1000 m	1:11.16	10
Kotaro Kasahara	1500 m	1:50.29	7
Ryota Kojima	1500 m	1:48.47	3rd place, bronze medalist(s)
Kazuya Yamada	1500 m	1:47.55	2nd place, silver medalist(s)
Masaya Yamada	1500 m	1:52.65	14
Motonaga Arito	5000 m	6:42.63	8
Kotaro Kasahara	5000 m	6:47.82	10
Taiyo Morino	5000 m	6:42.10	7
Motonaga Arito; Kotaro Kasahara; Taiyo Morino	Team pursuit	3:52.93	3rd place, bronze medalist(s)
Katsuhiro Kuratsubo; Wataru Morishige; Kazuya Yamada	Team sprint	1:20.72	3rd place, bronze medalist(s)

Women

Athlete	Event	Time	Rank
Iori Kitahara	100 m	10.81	11
Kako Yamane	100 m	10.80	10
Iori Kitahara	500 m	38.97	6
Anna Kubo	500 m	39.79	16
Rio Yamada	500 m	39.00	7
Kako Yamane	500 m	39.35	11
Rin Kosaka	1000 m	1:18.07	8
Anna Kubo	1000 m	1:18.75	9
Rio Yamada	1000 m	1:16.88	5
Kako Yamane	1000 m	1:19.76	13
Rin Kosaka	1500 m	2:00.76	6
Anna Kubo	1500 m	2:04.18	13
Yuna Onodera	1500 m	2:01.16	9
Rio Yamada	1500 m	2:00.38	4
Kyoko Nitta	3000 m	4:21.96	10
Yuna Onodera	3000 m	4:21.12	9
Yuka Takahashi	3000 m	4:20.73	8
Rin Kosaka; Yuna Onodera; Yuka Takahashi	Team pursuit	3:05.52	2nd place, silver medalist(s)
Kako Yamane; Rio Yamada; Rin Kosaka	Team sprint	1:32.81	4
