= Cross-country skiing at the 2025 Asian Winter Games – Men's 4 × 7.5 kilometre relay =

Men's 4 × 7.5 kilometre relay at the 2025 Asian Winter Games
- Venue: Yabuli Ski Resort
- Dates: 12 February 2025
- Competitors: 36 from 9 nations

Medalists
gold medal	China; Li Minglin, Ciren Zhandui, Bao Lin, Wang Qiang
silver medal	Japan; Shota Moriguchi, Takatsugu Uda, Yuito Habuki, Haruki Yamashita
bronze medal	Kazakhstan; Konstantin Bortsov, Nail Bashmakov, Olzhas Klimin, Vladislav Kovalyov

The men's 4 × 7.5 kilometre relay at the 2025 Asian Winter Games was held on 12 February 2025 at Yabuli Ski Resort in Harbin, China.

== Schedule ==
All times are China Standard Time (UTC+08:00)

Date	Time	Event
Wednesday, 12 February 2025	13:00	Final

== Results ==
Rank	Team	Time
1st place, gold medalist(s)	China (CHN)	1:12:09.6
	Li Minglin	19:31.9
	Ciren Zhandui	19:36.4
	Bao Lin	16:32.0
	Wang Qiang	16:29.3
2nd place, silver medalist(s)	Japan (JPN)	1:12:12.8
	Shota Moriguchi	19:40.5
	Takatsugu Uda	19:01.0
	Yuito Habuki	16:55.1
	Haruki Yamashita	16:36.2
3rd place, bronze medalist(s)	Kazakhstan (KAZ)	1:12:54.7
	Konstantin Bortsov	19:28.8
	Nail Bashmakov	19:40.8
	Olzhas Klimin	16:32.0
	Vladislav Kovalyov	17:13.1
4	South Korea (KOR)	1:15:27.2
	Lee Joon-seo	19:48.6
	Byun Ji-yeong	19:55.5
	Jeong Jong-won	17:33.2
	Lee Geon-yong	18:09.9
5	Mongolia (MGL)	1:20:34.0
	Batmönkhiin Achbadrakh	19:40.7
	Otgonlkhagvagiin Zolbayar	20:50.6
	Ariunjargalyn Khüslen	19:04.1
	Dashdondogiin Mönkhgerel	20:58.6
6	Iran (IRI)	1:27:13.1
	Alireza Moghdid	23:33.3
	Ahmad Reza Seid	24:18.0
	Mehdi Tir	20:25.3
	Danial Saveh-Shemshaki	18:56.5
7	India (IND)	1:28:34.5
	Padma Namgail	23:32.3
	Aman Kumar	25:44.5
	Rameez Ahmad Padder	19:06.8
	Shubam Parihar	20:10.9
8	Thailand (THA)	1:31:24.0
	Jakawan Charoensook	24:36.3
	Athit Nitisapon	24:17.6
	Jittipat Chitmunchaitham	21:27.1
	Thanatip Bunrit	21:03.0
9	Chinese Taipei (TPE)	1:33:38.6
	Lee Chieh-han	23:22.8
	Joseph James Peng	26:00.6
	Liu Hao-en	21:47.8
	Liu Hao-che	22:27.4
