= Cross-country skiing at the 2025 Asian Winter Games – Men's sprint classical =

Men's sprint classical at the 2025 Asian Winter Games
- Venue: Yabuli Ski Resort
- Dates: 8 February 2025
- Competitors: 42 from 13 nations

Medalists
gold medal	Wang Qiang	China
silver medal	Konstantin Bortsov	Kazakhstan
bronze medal	Saimuhaer Sailike	China

The men's sprint classical at the 2025 Asian Winter Games was held on 8 February 2025 at Yabuli Ski Resort in Harbin, China.

== Schedule ==
All times are China Standard Time (UTC+08:00)

Date	Time	Event
Saturday, 8 February 2025	11:20	Qualification
Saturday, 8 February 2025	13:35	Quarterfinals
Saturday, 8 February 2025	14:24	Semifinals
Saturday, 8 February 2025	14:50	Final

== Results ==
Legend

- DNS — Did not start
- DSQ — Disqualified

=== Qualification ===
Rank	Athlete	Time
1	Wang Qiang (CHN)	2:56.51
2	Saimuhaer Sailike (CHN)	3:02.18
3	Ciren Zhandui (CHN)	3:02.32
4	Hyuga Otaki (JPN)	3:04.05
5	Konstantin Bortsov (KAZ)	3:04.40
6	Haruki Yamashita (JPN)	3:05.11
7	Olzhas Klimin (KAZ)	3:08.35
8	Iliyas Issabek (KAZ)	3:08.46
9	Li Minglin (CHN)	3:09.43
10	Takatsugu Uda (JPN)	3:11.05
11	Lee Geon-yong (KOR)	3:11.74
12	Vladislav Kovalyov (KAZ)	3:12.91
13	Lee Jin-bok (KOR)	3:13.55
14	Batmönkhiin Achbadrakh (MGL)	3:14.53
15	Lee Joon-seo (KOR)	3:16.01
16	Shota Moriguchi (JPN)	3:18.14
17	Mark Chanloung (THA)	3:18.42
18	Byun Ji-yeong (KOR)	3:19.13
19	Otgonlkhagvagiin Zolbayar (MGL)	3:21.43
20	Danial Saveh-Shemshaki (IRI)	3:31.96
21	Ariunjargalyn Khüslen (MGL)	3:32.50
22	Thanakorn Ngoeichai (THA)	3:34.11
23	Tariel Zharkymbaev (KGZ)	3:36.11
24	Alireza Moghdid (IRI)	3:43.80
25	Mehdi Tir (IRI)	3:49.09
26	Thanatip Bunrit (THA)	3:50.53
27	Musa Rakhmanberdi Uulu (KGZ)	3:51.98
28	Dashdondogiin Mönkhgerel (MGL)	3:53.93
29	Ahmad Reza Seid (IRI)	3:54.43
30	Padma Namgail (IND)	4:00.15
31	Joseph James Peng (TPE)	4:03.40
32	Jittipat Chitmunchaitham (THA)	4:06.07
33	Manjeet (IND)	4:06.55
34	Liu Hao-en (TPE)	4:12.08
35	Rameez Ahmad Padder (IND)	4:16.27
36	Shubam Parihar (IND)	4:18.91
37	Liu Hao-che (TPE)	4:28.33
38	Fan Ruei-hong (TPE)	4:36.13
39	Tang Wei Yan (MAS)	4:53.18
40	Muhammad Shabbir (PAK)	5:31.08
—	Samer Tawk (LBN)	DNS
—	Marcelino Tawk (LBN)	DNS

=== Quarterfinals ===
- Qualification: First 2 in each heat (Q) and the next 2 fastest lucky loser (LL) advance to the semifinals.

==== Heat 1 ====
Rank	Athlete	Time	Notes
1	Wang Qiang (CHN)	3:06.24	Q
2	Takatsugu Uda (JPN)	3:06.52	Q
3	Lee Geon-yong (KOR)	3:06.90	
4	Danial Saveh-Shemshaki (IRI)	3:26.85	
5	Ariunjargalyn Khüslen (MGL)	3:26.93	
6	Padma Namgail (IND)	3:47.95	

==== Heat 2 ====
Rank	Athlete	Time	Notes
1	Hyuga Otaki (JPN)	3:05.68	Q
2	Olzhas Klimin (KAZ)	3:06.33	Q
3	Mark Chanloung (THA)	3:06.61	LL
4	Batmönkhiin Achbadrakh (MGL)	3:09.28	
5	Alireza Moghdid (IRI)	3:42.00	
6	Musa Rakhmanberdi Uulu (KGZ)	3:49.30	

==== Heat 3 ====
Rank	Athlete	Time	Notes
1	Haruki Yamashita (JPN)	3:06.29	Q
2	Konstantin Bortsov (KAZ)	3:06.48	Q
3	Shota Moriguchi (JPN)	3:06.67	LL
4	Lee Joon-seo (KOR)	3:06.73	
5	Thanatip Bunrit (THA)	3:41.67	
6	Mehdi Tir (IRI)	3:42.04	

==== Heat 4 ====
Rank	Athlete	Time	Notes
1	Vladislav Kovalyov (KAZ)	3:12.10	Q
2	Sailihaer Sailike (CHN)	3:12.74	Q
3	Li Minglin (CHN)	3:13.19	
4	Otgonlkhagvagiin Zolbayar (MGL)	3:14.65	
5	Thanakorn Ngoeichai (THA)	3:33.82	
6	Ahmad Reza Seid (IRI)	3:57.00	

==== Heat 5 ====
Rank	Athlete	Time	Notes
1	Ciren Zhandui (CHN)	3:05.37	Q
2	Iliyas Issabek (KAZ)	3:05.89	Q
3	Lee Jin-bok (KOR)	3:07.40	
4	Byun Ji-yeong (KOR)	3:12.21	
5	Tariel Zharkymbaev (KGZ)	3:36.51	
6	Dashdondogiin Mönkhgerel (MGL)	3:58.99	

=== Semifinals ===
- Qualification: First 2 in each heat (Q) and the next 2 fastest lucky loser (LL) advance to the final.

==== Heat 1 ====
Rank	Athlete	Time	Notes
1	Wang Qiang (CHN)	2:57.93	Q
2	Haruki Yamashita (JPN)	2:58.10	Q
3	Olzhas Klimin (KAZ)	2:58.24	LL
4	Hyuga Otaki (JPN)	2:58.97	LL
5	Takatsugu Uda (JPN)	3:02.53	
6	Shota Moriguchi (JPN)	3:04.84	

==== Heat 2 ====
Rank	Athlete	Time	Notes
1	Konstantin Bortsov (KAZ)	2:59.97	Q
2	Saimuhaer Sailike (CHN)	3:00.87	Q
3	Ciren Zhandui (CHN)	3:01.45	
4	Vladislav Kovalyov (KAZ)	3:02.15	
5	Iliyas Issabek (KAZ)	3:04.36	
6	Mark Chanloung (THA)	3:11.32	

=== Final ===
Rank	Athlete	Time
1st place, gold medalist(s)	Wang Qiang (CHN)	2:56.19
2nd place, silver medalist(s)	Konstantin Bortsov (KAZ)	2:58.28
3rd place, bronze medalist(s)	Saimuhaer Sailike (CHN)	2:58.51
4	Olzhas Klimin (KAZ)	2:58.90
5	Hyuga Otaki (JPN)	3:04.84
—	Haruki Yamashita (JPN)	DSQ
