= Kyrgyzstan at the 2025 Asian Winter Games =

- Flag of Kyrgyzstan
- IOC code: KGZ
- NOC: National Olympic Committee of the Kyrgyz Republic

in Harbin, China 7 February 2025 – 14 February 2025
- Competitors: 40 in 6 sports
- Flag bearer: Seifulov Mamed & Keremet Asanbaeva
- Medals: Gold 0 Silver 0 Bronze 0 Total 0

Asian Winter Games appearances
- 1996; 1999; 2003; 2007; 2011; 2017; 2025; 2029

Kyrgyzstan competed at the 2025 Asian Winter Games in Harbin, China, from February 7 to 14.

The Kyrgyzstani team is scheduled to be made up of 40 athletes competing in six sports. Hockey player Seifulov Mamed and curler Keremet Asanbaeva were the country's opening ceremony flagbearers.

== Competitors ==
The following table lists the Kyrgyzstani delegation per sport and gender.

Sport	Men	Women	Total
Alpine skiing	4	3	7
Biathlon	4	3	7
Cross-country skiing	1	0	1
Curling	4	1	5
Figure skating	0	1	1
Ice hockey	19	0	19
Total	32	8	40

- A lot of Kyrgyz athletes competed in both biathlon and cross-country skiing. The athletes who competed in both sports are included the biathlon count.

== Alpine skiing ==
Kyrgyzstan entered seven alpine skiers.

Men

Athlete	Event	Run 1		Run 2		Total	
Athlete	Event	Time	Rank	Time	Rank	Time	Rank
Denis Koniukhov	Slalom	DNF					
Nasyr Khurov	Slalom	55.82	27	53.51	21	1:49.33	21
Nadim Mukhtarov	Slalom	DNS					
Evgenii Timofeev	Slalom	53.77	22	52.45	18	1:46.22	18

Women

Athlete	Event	Run 1		Run 2		Total	
Athlete	Event	Time	Rank	Time	Rank	Time	Rank
Samira Amatova	Slalom	1:11.29	33	1:06.59	26	2:17.88	26
Almina Ibragimova	Slalom	1:07.52	28	1:05.62	22	2:13.14	22
Arina Shabanova	Slalom	1:11.82	34	DNF			

== Biathlon ==
Kyrgyzstan entered seven biathletes.

Men

Athlete	Event	Time	Misses	Rank
Eldar Kadyrov	Sprint	37:23.3	3+3	24
Musa Rakhmanberdi Uulu	Sprint	36:16.1	1+0	21
Artur Saparbekov	Sprint	35:28.3	3+0	19
Nurislam Zhumaliev	Sprint	44:28.3	5+2	27
Eldar Kadyrov; Musa Rakhmanberdi Uulu; Artur Saparbekov; Nurislam Zhumaliev	Relay	1:47:29.2	12+21	6

Women

Athlete	Event	Time	Misses	Rank
Antonina Borisenko	Sprint	40:00.4	3+4	23
Madina Saralaeva	Sprint	45:40.1	3+5	26
Diana Taalaibekova	Sprint	37:43.0	2+3	22

== Cross-country skiing ==
Kyrgyzstan entered seven cross-country skiers, six of whom competed in biathlon.

Distance

Athlete	Event	Final		
Athlete	Event	Time	Deficit	Rank
Eldar Kadyrov	Men's 10 km freestyle	26:00.2	+4:53.7	26
Musa Rakhmanberdi Uulu	Men's 10 km freestyle	25:56.4	+4:49.9	24
Artur Saparbekov	Men's 10 km freestyle	24:41.6	+3:35.1	20
Tariel Zharkymbaev	Men's 10 km freestyle	27:53.2	+6:46.7	33
Antonina Borisenko	Women's 5 km freestyle	18:12.8	+6:05.3	26
Madina Saralaeva	Women's 5 km freestyle	22:17.1	+10:09.6	32
Diana Taalaibekova	Women's 5 km freestyle	18:49.9	+6:42.4	28

Sprint

Athlete	Event	Qualification		Quarterfinals		Semifinals		Final	
Athlete	Event	Time	Rank	Time	Rank	Time	Rank	Time	Rank
Musa Rakhmanberdi Uulu	Men's sprint classical	3:51.98	27 Q	3:49.30	6	Did not advance			
Tariel Zharkymbaev	Men's sprint classical	3:36.11	23 Q	3:36.51	5	Did not advance			
Diana Taalaibekova	Women's sprint classical	6:00.20	27 Q	5:45.07	6	Did not advance			

== Curling ==
Summary

Team	Event	Group stage						Qualification	Semifinal	Final / BM	
Team	Event	Opposition Score	Opposition Score	Opposition Score	Opposition Score	Opposition Score	Rank	Opposition Score	Opposition Score	Opposition Score	Rank
Aibek Asanaliev; Iskhak Abykeev; Beksultan Myrzabaev; Mukhamed Dasifu	Men's team	South Korea; L 1–15	Philippines; L 2–12	Chinese Taipei; L 4–7	Kazakhstan; L 3–6	—	5	Did not advance			9
Keremet Asanbaeva; Iskhak Abykeev	Mixed doubles	Qatar; W 8–6	Philippines; L 2–10	China; L 3–8	Kazakhstan; L 5–12	South Korea; L 3–14	5	Did not advance			9

=== Men's tournament ===
Kyrgyzstan entered a men's team.

Round robin

Group A	Skip	W	L	W–L	PF	PA	EW	EL	BE	SE	DSC
South Korea	Lee Jae-beom	4	0	–	43	5	19	5	1	11	83.43
Philippines	Marc Pfister	3	1	–	28	12	11	9	5	2	78.11
Kazakhstan	Abylaikhan Zhuzbay	2	2	–	19	24	12	12	0	4	73.49
Chinese Taipei	Liu Bor-kai	1	3	–	16	35	9	17	0	2	108.93
Kyrgyzstan	Aibek Asanaliev	0	4	–	10	40	9	17	0	0	77.01

Draw 2

Sunday, 9 February, 21:00

Sheet D	1	2	3	4	5	6	7	8	Final
Kyrgyzstan (Asanaliev)	0	0	0	1	0	0	X	X	1
South Korea (Lee)	4	1	4	0	3	3	X	X	15

Draw 5

Monday, 10 February, 19:00

Sheet E	1	2	3	4	5	6	7	8	Final
Philippines (Pfister)	2	0	5	0	4	1	X	X	12
Kyrgyzstan (Asanaliev)	0	1	0	1	0	0	X	X	2

Draw 6

Tuesday, 11 February, 14:00

Sheet A	1	2	3	4	5	6	7	8	Final
Chinese Taipei (Liu)	1	0	2	0	2	2	0	X	7
Kyrgyzstan (Asanaliev)	0	2	0	1	0	0	1	X	4

Draw 8

Wednesday, 12 February, 14:00

Sheet B	1	2	3	4	5	6	7	8	Final
Kyrgyzstan (Asanaliev)	0	1	0	1	0	0	1	X	3
Kazakhstan (Zhuzbay)	1	0	3	0	1	1	0	X	6

=== Mixed doubles tournament ===
Kyrgyzstan entered a mixed doubles pair.

Round robin

Group B	Athletes	W	L	W–L	PF	PA	EW	EL	BE	SE	DSC
China	Han Yu / Wang Zhiyu	5	0	–	44	19	23	11	0	12	37.46
Philippines	Kathleen Dubberstein / Marc Pfister	4	1	–	50	22	21	13	0	12	58.24
South Korea	Kim Kyeong-ae / Seong Ji-hoon	3	2	–	50	22	24	9	0	14	47.83
Kazakhstan	Amina Seitzhanova / Azizbek Nadirbayev	2	3	–	26	43	14	21	0	6	55.33
Kyrgyzstan	Keremet Asanbaeva / Iskhak Abykeev	1	4	–	21	50	13	23	0	4	114.23
Qatar	Mabarka Al-Abdulla / Nasser Alyafei	0	5	–	15	50	8	26	0	1	98.31

Draw 1

Tuesday, 4 February, 10:00

Sheet B	1	2	3	4	5	6	7	8	Final
Qatar (Al-Abdulla / Alyafei)	1	0	0	4	0	0	0	1	6
Kyrgyzstan (Asanbaeva / Abykeev)	0	4	1	0	1	1	1	0	8

Draw 2

Tuesday, 4 February, 14:00

Sheet A	1	2	3	4	5	6	7	8	Final
Kyrgyzstan (Asanbaeva / Abykeev)	0	0	1	0	0	1	0	X	2
Philippines (Dubberstein / Pfister)	3	1	0	1	1	0	4	X	10

Draw 3

Wednesday, 5 February, 10:00

Sheet D	1	2	3	4	5	6	7	8	Final
Kyrgyzstan (Asanbaeva / Abykeev)	0	1	0	0	2	0	0	X	3
China (Han / Wang)	1	0	2	2	0	1	2	X	8

Draw 6

Thursday, 6 February, 10:00

Sheet E	1	2	3	4	5	6	7	8	Final
Kazakhstan (Seitzhanova / Nadirbayev)	1	0	3	3	0	4	1	X	12
Kyrgyzstan (Asanbaeva / Abykeev)	0	2	0	0	3	0	0	X	5

Draw 8

Thursday, 6 February, 18:00

Sheet C	1	2	3	4	5	6	7	8	Final
South Korea (Kim / Seong)	0	3	5	1	0	3	2	X	14
Kyrgyzstan (Asanbaeva / Abykeev)	1	0	0	0	2	0	0	X	3

== Figure skating ==
Kyrgyzstan entered one female figure skater.

Athlete(s)	Event	SP		FP		Total	
Athlete(s)	Event	Points	Rank	Points	Rank	Points	Rank
Daria Snegovskaia	Women's	40.21	15 Q	66.60	17	106.81	15

== Ice hockey ==
=== Men's tournament ===
Kyrgyzstan qualified a men's hockey team. The Kyrgyzstani team qualified after being ranked as one of the top 12 teams in Asia on the IIHF World Ranking as of May 2024. The Kyrgyzstani team finished the tournament in seventh place out of 14 teams.

Kyrgyzstan was represented by the following 19 athletes:

- AIslambek Abdyraev (F)
- Adil Bekmuratov (F)
- Zakhar Bem (F)
- Maksim Egorov (D)
- Ernazar Isamatov (D)
- Sultan Ismanov (F)
- Adis Kachkynbekov (D)
- Anton Kudashev (D)
- Egor Leshchenko (D)
- Belek Maksatbekov (F)
- Arslan Maraimbekov (G)
- Ersultan Mirbekov (F)
- Adilet Nuraliev (D)
- Denis Popov (D)
- Mamed Seifulov (F)
- Tair Supokhunov (F)
- Kuzma Terentyev (D)
- Aleksandr Titov (F)
- Artem Vasilev (G)

Legend: G = Goalie, D = Defense, F = Forward

Group stage

Pos	Team	Pld	W	OTW	OTL	L	GF	GA	GD	Pts	Qualification or relegation
1	Kyrgyzstan	3	2	1	0	0	49	10	+39	8	Quarterfinals
2	Kuwait	3	2	0	1	0	52	12	+40	7	Ranking playoffs
3	Singapore	3	1	0	0	2	25	22	+3	3	Ranking playoffs
4	Bahrain	3	0	0	0	3	1	83	−82	0	Ranking playoffs

Source: Asian Winter Games 2025

3 February 2025; 9:00	Kuwait	8–9 OT (5–3, 2–2, 1–3) (OT: 0–1)	Kyrgyzstan	Harbin Ice Hockey Arena, Harbin; Attendance: 1,837

Game reference
Referee: (Chinese Taipei) Shen Yen-chin; Linesmen: (China) Fu Dahe (South Korea) Su Won-il

5 February 2025; 13:00	Kyrgyzstan	29–0 (10–0, 10–0, 9–0)	Bahrain	Harbin Sport University Student Skating Hall, Harbin; Attendance: 398

Game reference
Referee: (Kazakhstan) Anton Boryayev; Linesmen: (Chinese Taipei) Hung Chi-lun (China) Yuan Zhaoyang

9 February 2025; 17:00	Kyrgyzstan	11–2 (3–1, 6–0, 2–1)	Singapore	Harbin Ice Hockey Arena, Harbin; Attendance: 2,765

Game reference
Referee: (Chinese Taipei) Shen Yen-chin; Linesmen: (China) Liu Haotian (Kazakhstan) Vladislav Mashenkin

Quarterfinals playoff

10 February 2025; 21:00	Hong Kong	5–6 OT (2–0, 2–3, 1–2) (OT: 0–1)	Kyrgyzstan	Harbin Sport University Student Skating Hall, Harbin; Attendance: 1,136

Game reference
Referees: (Kazakhstan) Anton Boryayev (China) Liu Jiaqi; Linesmen: (China) Chi Hongda (South Korea) Choi Do-yeon

Quarterfinals

11 February 2025; 16:00	South Korea	20–0 (6–0, 11–0, 3–0)	Kyrgyzstan	Harbin Sport University Student Skating Hall, Harbin; Attendance: 1,060

Game reference
Referees: (Kazakhstan) Timur Morev (Chinese Taipei) Shen Yen-chin; Linesmen: (Chinese Taipei) Hung Chi-lun (China) Yuan Zhaoyang
