= Cross-country skiing at the 2025 Asian Winter Games – Men's 10 kilometre freestyle =

Men's 10 kilometre freestyle at the 2025 Asian Winter Games
- Venue: Yabuli Ski Resort
- Dates: 10 February 2025
- Competitors: 47 from 14 nations

Medalists
gold medal	Haruki Yamashita	Japan
silver medal	Takatsugu Uda	Japan
bronze medal	Olzhas Klimin	Kazakhstan

The men's 10 kilometre freestyle at the 2025 Asian Winter Games was held on 10 February 2025 at Yabuli Ski Resort in Harbin, China.

== Schedule ==
All times are China Standard Time (UTC+08:00)

Date	Time	Event
Monday, 10 February 2025	11:00	Final

== Results ==
Legend

- DNS — Did not start

Rank	Athlete	Time
1st place, gold medalist(s)	Haruki Yamashita (JPN)	21:06.5
2nd place, silver medalist(s)	Takatsugu Uda (JPN)	21:16.5
3rd place, bronze medalist(s)	Olzhas Klimin (KAZ)	21:20.3
4	Bao Lin (CHN)	21:38.6
5	Wang Qiang (CHN)	21:50.2
6	Vladislav Kovalyov (KAZ)	21:52.6
7	Li Minglin (CHN)	21:52.8
8	Yuito Habuki (JPN)	22:01.3
9	Chen Degen (CHN)	22:10.5
10	Nail Bashmakov (KAZ)	22:12.8
11	Byun Ji-yeong (KOR)	22:16.5
12	Jeong Jong-won (KOR)	22:26.1
13	Lee Geon-yong (KOR)	22:55.4
14	Lee Joon-seo (KOR)	22:56.3
15	Batmönkhiin Achbadrakh (MGL)	22:59.7
16	Yernar Nursbekov (KAZ)	23:10.8
17	Otgonlkhagvagiin Zolbayar (MGL)	24:20.5
18	Ariunjargalyn Khüslen (MGL)	24:24.5
19	Danial Saveh-Shemshaki (IRI)	24:25.2
20	Artur Saparbekov (KGZ)	24:41.6
21	Rameez Ahmad Padder (IND)	25:01.5
22	Shubam Parihar (IND)	25:20.9
23	Manjeet (IND)	25:23.2
24	Musa Rakhmanberdi Uulu (KGZ)	25:56.4
25	Padma Namgail (IND)	25:57.7
26	Eldar Kadyrov (KGZ)	26:00.2
27	Alireza Moghdid (IRI)	26:18.4
28	Thanatip Bunrit (THA)	26:23.7
29	Ahmad Reza Seid (IRI)	26:40.4
30	Samer Tawk (LBN)	26:52.6
31	Mehdi Tir (IRI)	26:58.1
32	Lee Chieh-han (TPE)	27:00.5
33	Tariel Zharkymbaev (KGZ)	27:53.2
34	Jittipat Chitmunchaitham (THA)	28:13.2
35	Marcelino Tawk (LBN)	28:22.6
36	Athit Nitisapon (THA)	28:36.1
37	Jakawan Charoensook (THA)	28:51.1
38	Liu Hao-en (TPE)	28:57.2
39	Tserendendeviin Zolbayar (MGL)	29:23.2
40	Liu Hao-che (TPE)	29:58.5
41	Muhammad Shabbir (PAK)	30:23.1
42	Joseph James Peng (TPE)	30:56.9
43	Tang Wei Yan (MAS)	39:12.1
44	Dhanushka Bandara (SRI)	51:15.7
45	Shehan Muthugala (SRI)	1:09:44.6
46	Sajeev De Silva (SRI)	1:12:03.4
—	Hyuga Otaki (JPN)	DNS
