= Mongolia at the 2025 Asian Winter Games =

- Flag of Mongolia
- IOC code: MGL
- NOC: Mongolian Olympic Committee

in Harbin, China 7 February 2025 – 14 February 2025
- Competitors: 35 in 7 sports
- Flag bearers: Achbadrakh Batmunkh & Gereltuya Battulga
- Medals: Gold 0 Silver 0 Bronze 0 Total 0

Asian Winter Games appearances
- 1986; 1990; 1996; 1999; 2003; 2007; 2011; 2017; 2025; 2029

Mongolia competed at the 2025 Asian Winter Games in Harbin, China, from February 7 to 14. The Mongolian team consisted of 35 athletes competing in seven sports, including curling for the first time. Cross-country skier Achbadrakh Batmunkh and short-track speed skater Gereltuya Battulga were the country's opening ceremony flagbearers.

== Competitors ==
The following table lists the Mongolian delegation per sport and gender.

Sport	Men	Women	Total
Alpine skiing	4	4	8
Biathlon	4	4	8
Cross-country skiing	5	5	10
Curling	1	1	2
Figure skating	0	2	2
Short-track speed skating	3	1	4
Speed skating	1	0	1
Total	18	17	35

== Alpine skiing ==
Mongolia entered eight alpine skiers (four per gender).

Men

Athlete	Event	Run 1		Run 2		Total	
Athlete	Event	Time	Rank	Time	Rank	Time	Rank
Ariunbat Altanzul	Slalom	56.98	29	55.94	25	1:52.92	23
Temuulen Erdenechuluun	Slalom	57.37	31	58.17	29	1:55.54	28
Usukh-Ireedui Otgonbayar	Slalom	DSQ					
Temuulen Tsogjavkhlan	Slalom	DNF					

Women

Athlete	Event	Run 1		Run 2		Total	
Athlete	Event	Time	Rank	Time	Rank	Time	Rank
Sondorbayar Altanzul	Slalom	1:12.14	36	1:07.83	27	2:19.97	27
Itgel Amartuvshin	Slalom	1:12.73	37	1:08.18	28	2:20.91	31
Khaliun Khuderchuluun	Slalom	1:15.93	39	1:11.42	33	2:27.35	33
Injin Munkhbayar	Slalom	1:11.26	32	1:09.18	30	2:20.44	29

== Biathlon ==
Mongolia entered eight biathletes.

Men

Athlete	Event	Time	Misses	Rank
Ankhbold Boldbaatar	Sprint	32:52.0	1+0	15
Enkhsaikhan Enkhbat	Sprint	32:10.3	2+0	12
Gantulga Jargal	Sprint	33:52.7	1+1	18
Gantulga Otgondavaa	Sprint	37:04.5	2+2	23
Ankhbold Boldbaatar; Enkhsaikhan Enkhbat; Gantulga Jargal; Gantulga Otgondavaa	Relay	1:33:09.9	2+16	5

Women

Athlete	Event	Time	Misses	Rank
Enkhchimeg Davaadulam	Sprint	30:20.4	1+3	20
Erdenetungalag Khash-Erdene	Sprint	28:12.4	1+1	18
Sumiya Khurlee	Sprint	28:48.5	3+0	19
Doljinsuren Munkhbat	Sprint	26:46.1	1+3	16
Enkhchimeg Davaadulam; Erdenetungalag Khash-Erdene; Sumiya Khurlee; Doljinsuren Munkhbat	Relay	1:48:16.0	8+20	5

== Cross-country skiing ==
Mongolia entered ten cross-country skiers (five per gender).

Distance
Men

Athlete	Event	Final	
Athlete	Event	Time	Rank
Khuslen Ariunjargal	10 km freestyle	24:24.5	18
Achbadrakh Batmunkh	10 km freestyle	22:59.7	15
Zolbayar Otgonlkhagva	10 km freestyle	24:20.5	17
Zolbayar Tserendendev	10 km freestyle	29:23.2	39
Khuslen Ariunjargal; Achbadrakh Batmunkh; Munkhgerel Dashdondog; Zolbayar Otgonlkhagva	4 × 7.5 km relay	1:20:34.0	5

Women

Athlete	Event	Final	
Athlete	Event	Time	Rank
Enkhtuul Ariunsanaa	5 km freestyle	14:34.6	21
Nomin-Erdene Barsnyam	5 km freestyle	14:32.8	20
Ariuntungalag Enkhbayar	5 km freestyle	13:38.1	13
Ariunbold Tumur	5 km freestyle	13:51.1	18
Enkhtuul Ariunsanaa; Nomin-Erdene Barsnyam; Ariuntungalag Enkhbayar; Ariunbold Tumur	4 × 5 km relay	1:01:23.1	5

Sprint
Men

Athlete	Event	Qualification		Quarterfinals		Semifinals		Final	
Athlete	Event	Time	Rank	Time	Rank	Time	Rank	Time	Rank
Khuslen Ariunjargal	Sprint classical	3:32.50	21 Q	3:26.93	5	Did not advance			
Achbadrakh Batmunkh	Sprint classical	3:14.53	14 Q	3:09.28	4	Did not advance			
Munkhgerel Dashdondog	Sprint classical	3:53.93	28 Q	3:58.99	6	Did not advance			
Zolbayar Otgonlkhagva	Sprint classical	3:21.43	19 Q	3:14.65	4	Did not advance			

Women

Athlete	Event	Qualification		Quarterfinals		Semifinals		Final	
Athlete	Event	Time	Rank	Time	Rank	Time	Rank	Time	Rank
Nomin-Erdene Barsnyam	Sprint classical	4:05.33	15 Q	4:03.38	4	Did not advance			
Ariuntungalag Enkhbayar	Sprint classical	3:48.76	8 Q	3:49.71	2 Q	3:49.27	5	Did not advance	
Nandintsetseg Naranbat	Sprint classical	4:33.13	19 Q	4:21.04	4	Did not advance			
Ariunbold Tumur	Sprint classical	4:04.82	14 Q	3:50.85	3 LL	4:11.70	6	Did not advance	

== Curling ==
Mongolia entered two curlers (one per gender).

Summary

Team	Event	Group stage						Qualification	Semifinal	Final / BM	
Team	Event	Opposition Score	Opposition Score	Opposition Score	Opposition Score	Opposition Score	Rank	Opposition Score	Opposition Score	Opposition Score	Rank
Enkhzaya Ganbat; Bayar Bulgankhuu	Mixed doubles	Kuwait; L 5–6	Japan; L 0–19	Chinese Taipei; L 4–8	Thailand; L 5–10	Hong Kong; L 2–9	6	Did not advance			12

=== Mixed doubles tournament ===
Mongolia entered a mixed doubles pair.

Round robin

Pos	Team	Athletes	Pld	W	L	W–L	PF	PA	DSC	Qualification
1	Japan	Koana / Aoki	5	5	0	—	49	8	57.23	Semifinals
2	Hong Kong	Hung / Yan	5	4	1	—	46	26	56.68	Qualification
3	Chinese Taipei	Chou / Liu	5	3	2	—	44	25	65.56	Qualification
4	Thailand	Sonkham / Jearateerawit	5	2	3	—	29	46	142.12	
5	Kuwait	Abdulateef / Al-Kandari	5	1	4	—	14	41	197.23	
6	Mongolia	Enkhzayaa / Bayar	5	0	5	—	16	52	134.74	

Source: Official website

Draw 1

Tuesday, 4 February, 10:00

Sheet A	1	2	3	4	5	6	7	8	Final
Kuwait	1	0	2	0	1	1	0	1	6
Mongolia 🔨	0	1	0	3	0	0	1	0	5

Draw 2

Tuesday, 4 February, 14:00

Sheet D	1	2	3	4	5	6	7	8	Final
Mongolia	0	0	0	0	0	0	X	X	0
Japan 🔨	5	4	1	3	5	1	X	X	19

Draw 4

Wednesday, 5 February, 14:00

Sheet B	1	2	3	4	5	6	7	8	Final
Mongolia	2	0	0	0	1	0	1	X	4
Chinese Taipei 🔨	0	4	2	1	0	1	0	X	8

Draw 5

Wednesday, 5 February, 18:00

Sheet C	1	2	3	4	5	6	7	8	Final
Mongolia	1	0	2	0	0	2	0	X	5
Thailand 🔨	0	3	0	2	1	0	4	X	10

Draw 8

Thursday, 6 February, 18:00

Sheet E	1	2	3	4	5	6	7	8	Final
Hong Kong 🔨	1	0	4	1	0	2	1	X	9
Mongolia	0	1	0	0	1	0	0	X	2

== Figure skating ==
Mongolia entered two female figure skaters.

Athlete(s)	Event	SP		FS		Total	
Athlete(s)	Event	Points	Rank	Points	Rank	Points	Rank
Maral-Erdene Gansukh	Women's	30.64	16	54.72	20	85.36	18
Misheel Otgonbaatar	Women's	26.32	19	55.30	19	81.62	19

== Short-track speed skating ==
Mongolia entered four short-track speed skaters (three men and one woman). Gereltuya Battulga advanced to the semifinals of a short-track speed skating event, the first ever by a Mongolian athlete.

Men

Athlete	Event	Heat		Quarterfinal		Semifinal		Final	
Athlete	Event	Time	Rank	Time	Rank	Time	Rank	Time	Rank
Mönkh-Erdene Erdenebileg	500 m	44.610	3	Did not advance					26
Mönkh-Erdene Garmaagiin	500 m	44.829	4	Did not advance					27
Borkhüü Mönkhbayar	500 m	59.092	5	Did not advance					36
Mönkh-Erdene Erdenebileg	1000 m	1:50.694	5	Did not advance					33
Mönkh-Erdene Garmaagiin	1000 m	1:34.339	4	Did not advance					19
Borkhüü Mönkhbayar	1000 m	1:41.762	5	Did not advance					28
Mönkh-Erdene Erdenebileg	1500 m	2:33.000	4	Did not advance					25
Mönkh-Erdene Garmaagiin	1500 m	2:27.762	5	Did not advance					16
Borkhüü Mönkhbayar	1500 m	2:40.852	4	Did not advance					19

Women

Athlete	Event	Heat		Quarterfinal		Semifinal		Final	
Athlete	Event	Time	Rank	Time	Rank	Time	Rank	Time	Rank
Gereltuya Battulga	500 m	48.136	4	Did not advance					17
Gereltuya Battulga	1000 m	1:41.324	3 Q	1:40.249	4	Did not advance			15
Gereltuya Battulga	1500 m	—N/a		2:38.674	3 Q	2:58.964	6	Did not advance	16

== Speed skating ==
Mongolia entered one male speed skater.

Athlete	Event	Time	Rank
Tögöldör Bekhbat	Men's 500 m	43.16	21
Tögöldör Bekhbat	Men's 1000 m	1:28.18	22
