= Alpine skiing at the 2025 Asian Winter Games =

- Venue: Yabuli Ski Resort
- Dates: 8–9 February 2025
- Competitors: 103 from 23 nations

Alpine skiing competitions at the 2025 Asian Winter Games in Harbin, China, were held at the Yabuli Ski Resort between 8 and 9 February 2025.

A total of 23 NOCs participated officially. Bhutan also had a competitor. However, due to issues with his FIS license, his results was not included in the official report.

== Schedule ==
F	Final

Event↓/Date →	8th Sat	9th Sun
Men's slalom		F
Women's slalom	F	

== Medalists ==
Event	Gold	Silver	Bronze
Men's slalom	Takayuki Koyama; Japan	Jung Dong-hyun; South Korea	Neo Kamada; Japan
Women's slalom	Chisaki Maeda; Japan	Gim So-hui; South Korea	Eren Watanabe; Japan

== Medal table ==
Rank	Nation	Gold	Silver	Bronze	Total
1	Japan (JPN)	2	0	2	4
2	South Korea (KOR)	0	2	0	2
Totals (2 entries)		2	2	2	6

== Participating nations ==
A total of 103 athletes from 23 nations competed in alpine skiing at the 2025 Asian Winter Games:

- China (8)
- Chinese Taipei (3)
- Hong Kong (7)
- India (7)
- Iran (2)
- Japan (7)
- Jordan (1)
- Kazakhstan (8)
- Kuwait (2)
- Kyrgyzstan (6)
- Lebanon (4)
- Malaysia (1)
- Mongolia (8)
- Nepal (4)
- Pakistan (1)
- Philippines (2)
- Saudi Arabia (3)
- Singapore (1)
- South Korea (8)
- Tajikistan (4)
- Thailand (6)
- United Arab Emirates (3)
- Uzbekistan (7)
