= Kuwait at the 2025 Asian Winter Games =

- Flag of Kuwait
- IOC code: KUW
- NOC: Kuwait Olympic Committee
- Website: www.kuwaitolympic.org

in Harbin, China 7 February 2025 – 14 February 2025
- Competitors: 25 in 4 sports
- Flag bearer: Mohammed Al Duaij & Fatema Abdulateef
- Medals: Gold 0 Silver 0 Bronze 0 Total 0

Asian Winter Games appearances
- 1996; 1999; 2003; 2007; 2011; 2017; 2025; 2029

Other related appearances
- Athletes from Kuwait (2011); Independent Olympic Athletes (2017)

Kuwait competed at the 2025 Asian Winter Games in Harbin, China, from February 7 to 14.

The Kuwaiti team consisted of 25 athletes. During the opening ceremony, hockey player Mohammed Al Duaij and curler Fatema Abdulateef were the country's flagbearers.

== Competitors ==
The following table lists the Kuwaiti delegation per sport and gender.

Sport	Men	Women	Total
Alpine skiing	2	0	2
Curling	1	1	2
Freestyle skiing	1	0	1
Ice hockey	20	0	20
Total	24	1	25

== Alpine skiing ==
Kuwait entered two male alpine skiers.

Athlete	Event	Run 1		Run 2		Total	
Athlete	Event	Time	Rank	Time	Rank	Time	Rank
Faris Al Obaid	Men's slalom	1:23.90	45	1:21.72	39	2:45.62	39
Abdulrahman Al Wahibi	Men's slalom	1:21.34	44	1:18.52	38	2:39.86	38

== Curling ==
Kuwait entered two curlers.

Summary

Team	Event	Group stage						Qualification	Semifinal	Final / BM	
Team	Event	Opposition Score	Opposition Score	Opposition Score	Opposition Score	Opposition Score	Rank	Opposition Score	Opposition Score	Opposition Score	Rank
Fatema Abdulateef; Saud Alkandari	Mixed doubles	Mongolia; W 6–5	Thailand; L 3–12	Chinese Taipei; L 3–13	Hong Kong; L 2–11	Japan; L	5	Did not advance			10

=== Mixed doubles tournament ===
Kuwait entered a mixed doubles pair. Abdulateef and Alkandari finished fourth in their group in the preliminary stage.

Round robin

Group A	Athletes	W	L	W–L	PF	PA	EW	EL	BE	SE	DSC
Japan	Tori Koana / Go Aoki	5	0	–	49	8	21	5	0	15	57.23
Hong Kong	Ling-Yue Hung / Martin Yan	4	1	–	46	26	19	17	0	8	56.68
Chinese Taipei	Chou Yi-hsuan / Liu Bor-kai	3	2	–	44	25	20	14	0	9	65.56
Thailand	Chanatip Sonkham / Teekawin Jearateerawit	2	3	–	29	46	14	20	0	7	142.12
Kuwait	Fatema Abdulateef / Saud Alkandari	1	4	–	14	41	12	17	0	4	197.23
Mongolia	Enkhzaya Ganbat / Bayar Bulgankhuu	0	5	–	16	52	11	24	0	2	134.74

Draw 1

Tuesday, 4 February, 10:00

Sheet A	1	2	3	4	5	6	7	8	Final
Kuwait (Abdulateef / Alkandari)	1	0	2	0	1	1	0	1	6
Mongolia (Ganbat / Bulgankhuu)	0	1	0	3	0	0	1	0	5

Draw 2

Tuesday, 4 February, 14:00

Sheet B	1	2	3	4	5	6	7	8	Final
Thailand (Sonkham / Jearateerawit)	0	1	4	1	0	4	2	X	12
Kuwait (Abdulateef / Alkandari)	1	0	0	0	2	0	0	X	3

Draw 3

Wednesday, 5 February, 10:00

Sheet E	1	2	3	4	5	6	7	8	Final
Chinese Taipei (Chou / Liu)	2	0	5	2	0	0	4	X	13
Kuwait (Abdulateef / Alkandari)	0	1	0	0	1	1	0	X	3

Draw 4

Wednesday, 5 February, 14:00

Sheet D	1	2	3	4	5	6	7	8	Final
Kuwait (Abdulateef / Alkandari)	0	0	1	0	0	0	1	X	2
Hong Kong (Hung / Yan)	5	1	0	1	2	2	0	X	11

Draw 7

Thursday, 6 February, 14:00

Sheet C	1	2	3	4	5	6	7	8	Final
Japan (Koana / Aoki)	5	5							W
Kuwait (Abdulateef / Alkandari)	0	0							L

- Kuwait forfeited the game after end 2 as a player was feeling unwell and could not continue to play.

== Freestyle skiing ==
Kuwait entered one male freestyle skier.

Men

Athlete	Event	Qualification				Final
Athlete	Event	Run 1	Run 2	Run 3	Best	Rank
Salman Al-Kandari	Halfpipe	Did not start				
Salman Al-Kandari	Slopestyle	42.00	DNI	DNI	42.00	10

== Ice hockey ==
=== Men's tournament ===
Kuwait qualified a men's hockey team. The Kuwaiti team qualified after being ranked as one of the top 12 teams in Asia on the IIHF World Ranking as of May 2024.

Kuwait was represented by the following 20 athletes:

- Barvik Adam (G)
- Mashari Al-Ajmi (F)
- Abdullah Al-Asousi (F)
- Jasem Al-Awadhi (D)
- Abdulrazaq Al-Daei (D)
- Mohammed Al-Duaij (D)
- Meshal Al-Foudari (D)
- Abdulaziz Al-Khashan (F)
- Abdulmohsen Al-Khashram (F)
- Abdulaziz Al-Maraghy (F)
- Abdullah Al-Maragi (F)
- Mohammad Al-Maraqi (D)
- Salem Al-Mari (F)
- Zaid Al-Saied (G)
- Valery Budzevich (F)
- Ilia Drozdetskikh (F)
- Khalaf Khalaf (D)
- Anton Tcibin (D)
- Kamil Vavra (F)
- Bojan Zidarevic (F)

Legend: G = Goalie, D = Defense, F = Forward

Group stage

Pos	Team	Pld	W	OW	OL	L	GF	GA	GD	Pts	Qualification
1	Kyrgyzstan	3	2	1	0	0	49	10	+39	8	Quarterfinals
2	Kuwait	3	2	0	1	0	52	12	+40	7	Placement 9–10
3	Singapore	3	1	0	0	2	25	22	+3	3	Placement 11–12
4	Bahrain	3	0	0	0	3	1	83	−82	0	Placement 13–14

Source: OCA

3 February; 9:00	Kuwait	8–9 OT (5–3, 2–2, 1–3) (OT: 0–1)	Kyrgyzstan	Harbin Ice Hockey Arena, Harbin; Attendance: 1,837

Game reference

Adam Barvík
Goalies
Arslan Maraimbekov
Artem Vasilev
Referee:
Shen Yen-chin (TPE)

Tsibin (Drozdetskikh) – 03:57	1–0
	1–1	04:11 – Egorov (Abdyraev)
	1–2	04:42 – Bekmuratov (Ismanov, Mirbekov)
	1–3	06:44 – Seifulov (Bem, Nuraliev)
Al-Mari (Drozdetskikh, Budzevich) – 07:32	2–3
Drozdetskikh (Tsibin, Budzevich) – 08:20	3–3
Drozdetskikh (Tsibin, Budzevich) – 10:22	4–3
Tsibin (Drozdetskikh) – 19:26	5–3
Drozdetskikh – 28:37	6–3
Tsibin (Drozdetskikh, Budzevich) – 30:13	7–3
	7–4	35:50 – Seifulov (Titov, Popov) (PP)
	7–5	36:31 – Mirbekov (Bekmuratov, Kachkynbekov)
	7–6	42:07 – Abdyraev (Titov, Seifulov)
	7–7	43:10 – Seifulov (Mirbekov)
Drozdetskikh (Tsibin, Budzevich) – 44:03	8–7
	8–8	59:26 – Seifulov (Terentyev, Abdyraev)
	8–9	60:19 – Seifulov (Abdyraev)

12 min
Penalties
8 min
21
Shots
64

5 February; 9:00	Singapore	3–10 (0–3, 0–4, 3–3)	Kuwait	Harbin Sport University Stadium, Harbin; Attendance: 383

Game reference

Joshua Lee
Goalies
Adam Barvík
Zaid Al-Saied
Referee:
Timur Morev (KAZ)

	0–1	09:26 – Vavra (Al-Awadhi, Zidarević)
	0–2	10:12 – Tsibin (Al-Khashan, Al-Khalaf)
	0–3	15:43 – Drozdetskikh (Budzevich, Al-Khalaf)
	0–4	20:51 – Tsibin (Budzevich)
	0–5	24:55 – Drozdetskikh (Budzevich, Al-Khalaf)
	0–6	25:49 – Tsibin (Vavra, Al-Awadhi) (PP)
	0–7	36:10 – Al-Awadhi (Vavra)
Chan – 41:24	1–7
	1–8	48:50 – Zidarević (Vavra)
	1–9	52:06 – Drozdetskikh (Al-Awadhi, Al-Daei) (PP)
Kodrowski (Chan) – 53:20	2–9
	2–10	54:40 – Budzevich (Drozdetskikh, Al-Mari)
Chan (Kodrowski, Chew W.) (PP) – 56:30	3–10

10 min
Penalties
10 min
28
Shots
47

9 February; 21:00	Bahrain	0–34 (0–10, 0–10, 0–14)	Kuwait	Harbin Ice Hockey Arena, Harbin; Attendance: 907

Game reference

Rashed Al-Mutlaq
Abdulla Al-Adhab
Goalies
Adam Barvík
Zaid Al-Saied
Referee:
Li Ho Ching (HKG)

0–1	01:38 – Al-Khashan (Al-Ajmi, Al-Foudari)
0–2	03:52 – Drozdetskikh (Tsibin)
0–3	04:20 – Tsibin (Budzevich, Drozdetskikh)
0–4	06:18 – Al-Khalaf (Al-Khashan, Al-Foudari)
0–5	08:26 – Vavra (Al-Awadhi, Abdula. Al-Maragi)
0–6	10:32 – Tsibin (Al-Foudari)
0–7	13:35 – Al-Mari (Al-Khalaf, Tsibin) (PP)
0–8	14:05 – Vavra (Zidarević)
0–9	17:00 – Abdull. Al-Maragi (Vavra, Al-Duaij)
0–10	17:56 – Drozdetskikh (Tsibin, Budzevich)
0–11	21:37 – Vavra (Al-Daei)
0–12	21:56 – Al-Khashan (Al-Khashram)
0–13	26:21 – Zidarević (Vavra, Al-Awadhi)
0–14	28:36 – Al-Khashram (Tsibin) (SH)
0–15	29:46 – Tsibin (Budzevich)
0–16	30:05 – Budzevich (Drozdetskikh)
0–17	35:05 – Drozdetskikh
0–18	35:56 – Vavra (Al-Awadhi, Zidarević)
0–19	36:56 – Al-Ajmi (Al-Khashram, Al-Foudari)
0–20	39:06 – Drozdetskikh (Budzevich, Al-Khalaf)
0–21	40:35 – Budzevich (Drozdetskikh, Tsibin)
0–22	41:13 – Al-Daei (Vavra, Al-Awadhi) (PP)
0–23	42:15 – Tsibin
0–24	45:31 – Tsibin (Budzevich, Drozdetskikh)
0–25	46:19 – Vavra (Zidarević, Al-Awadhi)
0–26	50:00 – Budzevich (Tsibin, Drozdetskikh)
0–27	50:24 – Zidarević (Vavra, Al-Awadhi)
0–28	55:36 – Tsibin (Budzevich) (SH)
0–29	56:24 – Zidarević (Vavra)
0–30	57:57 – Al-Asousi (Vavra, Abdull. Al-Maragi)
0–31	58:29 – Tsibin (Budzevich, Drozdetskikh)
0–32	58:48 – Al-Mari (Tsibin, Drozdetskikh)
0–33	59:23 – Vavra (Al-Awadhi)
0–34	59:33 – Al-Awadhi (Vavra)

8 min
Penalties
6 min
9
Shots
86

Ninth place game

10 February; 17:00	Kuwait	8–4 (3–2, 3–2, 2–0)	Turkmenistan	Harbin Sport University Stadium, Harbin; Attendance: 668

Game reference

Adam Barvík
Goalies
Keremli Çaryýew
Referees:
Anton Boryayev (KAZ)
Chae Young-jin (KOR)

	0–1	07:01 – Baýjaýew (Esenow, Kakabaýew)
Budzevich (Drozdetskikh) – 09:23	1–1
Vavra (PS) – 09:59	2–1
	2–2	12:29 – Baýjaýew (Esenow, Kakajanow)
Drozdetskikh (Budzevich, Tsibin) – 16:48	3–2
Tsibin (Drozdetskikh) – 28:29	4–2
Budzevich (Tsibin, Drozdetskikh) (PP) – 32:24	5–2
	5–3	34:31 – Wahowskiý (Gurbanow)
	5–4	35:59 – Gurbanow (Wahowskiý)
Budzevich (Al-Mari, Tsibin) – 39:05	6–4
Drozdetskikh (Budzevich) (SH) – 48:59	7–4
Al-Mari (Budzevich, Drozdetskikh) – 50:34	8–4

8 min
Penalties
8 min
37
Shots
34
