= Pakistan at the 2025 Asian Winter Games =

- Flag of Pakistan
- IOC code: PAK
- NOC: Pakistan Olympic Association

in Harbin, China 7 February 2025 – 14 February 2025
- Competitors: 2 in 2 sports
- Flag bearer: Muhammad Karim
- Medals: Gold 0 Silver 0 Bronze 0 Total 0

Asian Winter Games appearances
- 1996; 1999; 2003; 2007; 2011; 2017; 2025; 2029

Pakistan competed at the 2025 Asian Winter Games in Harbin, China, from February 7 to 14. The Pakistani delegation consisted of two male athletes competing in two sports. The team also consisted of four officials. Alpine skier Muhammad Karim was the country's opening ceremony flagbearer.

== Competitors ==
The following table lists the Pakistani delegation per sport and gender.

Sport	Men	Women	Total
Alpine skiing	1	0	1
Cross-country skiing	1	0	1
Total	2	0	2

== Alpine skiing ==
Pakistan entered one male alpine skier.

Men

Athlete	Event	Run 1		Run 2		Total	
Athlete	Event	Time	Rank	Time	Rank	Time	Rank
Muhammad Karim	Men's slalom	55.74	26	DSQ		DSQ	

== Cross-country skiing ==
Pakistan entered one male cross-country skier skier.

Men
Distance

Athlete	Event	Final		
Athlete	Event	Time	Deficit	Rank
Muhammad Shabbir	10 km freestyle	30:23.1	+9:16.6	41

Sprint

Athlete	Event	Qualification		Quarterfinals		Semifinals		Final	
Athlete	Event	Time	Rank	Time	Rank	Time	Rank	Time	Rank
Muhammad Shabbir	Sprint classical	5:31.08	40	Did not advance					
