= Iran at the 2025 Asian Winter Games =

- IOC code: IRI
- NOC: National Olympic Committee of the Islamic Republic of Iran

in Harbin
- Competitors: 14 in 2 sports
- Flag bearers: Mohammad Kiadarbandsari; Marzieh Baha
- Medals: Gold 0 Silver 0 Bronze 0 Total 0

Asian Winter Games appearances
- 1990; 1996; 1999; 2003; 2007; 2011; 2017; 2025; 2029

Iran competed at the 2025 Asian Winter Games in Harbin, China, from February 7 to 14. The Iranian team consisted of 14 athletes competing in three disciplines. During the opening ceremony, alpine skier Mohammad Kiadarbandsari and ski mountaineer Marzieh Baha were the country's flagbearers.

== Competitors ==
Sport	Men	Women	Total
Alpine skiing	1	1	2
Cross-country skiing	4	4	8
Ski mountaineering	2	2	4
Total	7	7	14

== Results by event ==
=== Ski mountaineering ===
Athlete	Event	Qualification		Semifinal		Final	Rank
Athlete	Event	Time	Rank	Time	Rank	Time	Rank
Ali Kalhor	Men's sprint	3:17.93	8 Q	3:03.40	4	Did not advance	8
Mohsen Saveei	Men's sprint	3:39.88	13	Did not advance			13
Marzieh Baha	Women's sprint	4:07.29	10 Q	3:57.49	5	Did not advance	10
Fatemeh Seid	Women's sprint	4:10.05	11 Q	4:13.64	6	Did not advance	11
Marzieh Baha; Ali Kalhor	Mixed relay	17:08.24	8 Q	—N/a		37:41.84	9
Fatemeh Seid; Mohsen Saveei	Mixed relay	18:34.45	10 Q	—N/a		39:10.08	11

=== Skiing ===
==== Alpine ====
Athlete	Event	Run 1		Run 2		Total	
Athlete	Event	Time	Rank	Time	Rank	Time	Rank
Mohammad Kiadarbandsari	Men's slalom	48.80	11	47.02	6	1:35.82	8
Maryam Kiashemshaki	Women's slalom	58.37	21	DNF	—	—	—

==== Cross-country ====
Sprint

Athlete	Event	Qualification		Quarterfinal		Semifinal		Final	Rank
Athlete	Event	Time	Rank	Time	Rank	Time	Rank	Time	Rank
Alireza Moghdid	Men's sprint classical	3:43.80	24 Q	3:42.00	5	Did not advance			23
Danial Saveh-Shemshaki	Men's sprint classical	3:31.96	20 Q	3:26.85	4	Did not advance			19
Ahmad Reza Seid	Men's sprint classical	3:54.43	29 Q	3:57.00	6	Did not advance			28
Mehdi Tir	Men's sprint classical	3:49.09	25 Q	3:42.04	6	Did not advance			25
Samaneh Beyrami Baher	Women's sprint classical	4:15.77	18 Q	4:21.94	4	Did not advance			17
Atefeh Salehi	Women's sprint classical	5:04.50	21 Q	4:56.67	5	Did not advance			20
Farnoush Shemshaki	Women's sprint classical	5:13.75	22 Q	5:36.46	5	Did not advance			21
Sahel Tir	Women's sprint classical	4:45.03	20 Q	4:46.04	4	Did not advance			19

Distance

Athlete	Event	Time	Rank
Alireza Moghdid	Men's 10 km freestyle	26:18.4	27
Danial Saveh-Shemshaki	Men's 10 km freestyle	24:25.2	19
Ahmad Reza Seid	Men's 10 km freestyle	26:40.4	29
Mehdi Tir	Men's 10 km freestyle	26:58.1	31
Alireza Moghdid; Ahmad Reza Seid; Mehdi Tir; Danial Saveh-Shemshaki	Men's 4 × 7.5 km relay	1:27:13.1	6
Samaneh Beyrami Baher	Women's 5 km freestyle	14:20.0	19
Atefeh Salehi	Women's 5 km freestyle	16:01.7	23
Farnoush Shemshaki	Women's 5 km freestyle	17:10.3	24
Sahel Tir	Women's 5 km freestyle	15:58.5	22
Samaneh Beyrami Baher; Sahel Tir; Farnoush Shemshaki; Atefeh Salehi	Women's 4 × 5 km relay	1:09:41.0	6
