= Speed skating at the 2025 Asian Winter Games – Men's 1500 metres =

Men's 1500 metres at the 2025 Asian Winter Games
- Venue: Heilongjiang Speed Skating Hall
- Dates: 8 February 2025
- Competitors: 19 from 6 nations

Medalists
gold medal	Ning Zhongyan	China
silver medal	Kazuya Yamada	Japan
bronze medal	Ryota Kojima	Japan

The men's 1500 metres competition in speed skating at the 2025 Asian Winter Games was held on 8 February 2025 in Harbin, China.

== Schedule ==
All times are China Standard Time (UTC+08:00)

Date	Time	Event
Saturday, 8 February 2025	13:20	Final

== Records ==
Prior to this competition, the existing world and Games records were as follows.

World Record	Kjeld Nuis (NED)	1:40.17	Salt Lake City, United States	10 March 2019
Games Record	Kim Min-seok (KOR)	1:46.26	Sapporo, Japan	23 February 2017

== Results ==
Rank	Pair	Athlete	Time	Notes
1st place, gold medalist(s)	8	Ning Zhongyan (CHN)	1:45.85	GR
2nd place, silver medalist(s)	9	Kazuya Yamada (JPN)	1:47.55	
3rd place, bronze medalist(s)	10	Ryota Kojima (JPN)	1:48.47	
4	8	Chung Jae-won (KOR)	1:48.58	
5	7	Liu Hanbin (CHN)	1:48.99	
6	7	Oh Hyun-min (KOR)	1:49.26	
7	10	Kotaro Kasahara (JPN)	1:50.29	
8	4	Nuraly Akzhol (KAZ)	1:50.98	
9	6	Demyan Gavrilov (KAZ)	1:51.08	
10	4	Roman Binazarov (KAZ)	1:51.20	
11	5	Sun Chuanyi (CHN)	1:51.24	
12	6	Tai Wei-lin (TPE)	1:51.30	
13	5	Yang Ho-jun (KOR)	1:51.37	
14	9	Masaya Yamada (JPN)	1:52.65	
15	3	Bakdaulet Sagatov (KAZ)	1:52.72	
16	3	Chandra Mouli Danda (IND)	2:02.41	
17	1	Amitesh Mishra (IND)	2:02.71	
18	2	Vishwaraj Jadeja (IND)	2:05.80	
19	2	Srivatsa Srikantha Rao (IND)	2:06.60	
