= Freestyle skiing at the 2025 Asian Winter Games – Men's slopestyle =

Men's slopestyle at the 2025 Asian Winter Games
- Venue: Yabuli Ski Resort
- Dates: 11 February 2025
- Competitors: 11 from 6 nations

Medalists
gold medal	Rai Kasamura	Japan
silver medal	Ruka Ito	Japan
bronze medal	Paul Vieuxtemps	Thailand

The men's slopestyle at the 2025 Asian Winter Games was held on 11 February 2025 at Yabuli Ski Resort in Harbin, China.

== Schedule ==
All times are China Standard Time (UTC+08:00)

Date	Time	Event
Tuesday, 11 February 2025	11:15	Final

== Results ==
Legend

- DNI — Did not improve
- DNS — Did not start

Rank	Athlete	Run 1	Run 2	Run 3	Best
1st place, gold medalist(s)	Rai Kasamura (JPN)	90.00	93.25	DNI	93.25
2nd place, silver medalist(s)	Ruka Ito (JPN)	81.75	88.50	DNI	88.50
3rd place, bronze medalist(s)	Paul Vieuxtemps (THA)	59.75	DNI	85.25	85.25
4	Lin Hao (CHN)	69.75	DNI	78.50	78.50
5	Shin Yeong-seop (KOR)	75.50	DNI	DNI	75.50
6	Yoon Jong-hyun (KOR)	62.75	DNI	DNI	62.75
7	Abdulla Al-Rasheed (UAE)	60.75	DNI	DNI	60.75
8	Sultan Al-Ghandi (UAE)	56.25	DNI	DNI	56.25
9	Lee Seo-jun (KOR)	50.00	DNS	DNS	50.00
10	Salman Al-Kandari (KUW)	42.00	DNI	DNI	42.00
—	Brendon Choi (KOR)				DNS
