= India at the 2025 Asian Winter Games =

- Flag of India
- IOC code: IND
- NOC: Indian Olympic Committee

in Harbin, China 7 February 2025 – 14 February 2025
- Competitors: 59 in 6 sports
- Flag bearers: Arif Khan & Bhavani Thekkada
- Medals: Gold 0 Silver 0 Bronze 0 Total 0

Asian Winter Games appearances
- 1986; 1990; 1996; 1999; 2003; 2007; 2011; 2017; 2025; 2029

India competed at the 2025 Asian Winter Games in Harbin, China, from February 7 to 14.

The final Indian team consisted of 59 athletes. Alpine skier Arif Khan and cross-country skier Bhavani Thekkada were the country's opening ceremony flagbearers. India finished the event with no medals.

== Competitors ==
The following table lists the Indian delegation per sport and gender.

Sport	Men	Women	Total
Alpine skiing	4	3	7
Cross-country skiing	5	1	6
Figure skating	1	1	2
Ice hockey	23	0	23
Short-track speed skating	6	6	12
Speed skating	7	2	9
Total	46	13	59

== Alpine skiing ==
India entered seven alpine skiers.

Men

Athlete	Event	Run 1		Run 2		Total	
Athlete	Event	Time	Rank	Time	Rank	Time	Rank
Hussain Baqir	Slalom	58.59	34	DNF			
Arif Khan	Slalom	56.40	28	57.08	27	1:53.48	25
Sunil Kumar	Slalom	58.18	33	55.55	23	1:53.73	26
Mayank Panwar	Slalom	54.57	25	53.41	19	1:47.98	20

Women

Athlete	Event	Run 1		Run 2		Total	
Athlete	Event	Time	Rank	Time	Rank	Time	Rank
Sandhya Sandhya	Slalom	1:07.05	26	1:04.38	21	2:11.43	21
Aanchal Thakur	Slalom	1:10.34	30	1:06.07	24	2:16.41	25
Tanuja Thakur	Slalom	1:11.92	35	1:08.37	29	2:20.29	28
Mehak Kawan	Slalom	DNS					

== Cross-country skiing ==
Distance
Men

Athlete	Event	Total		
Athlete	Event	Time	Deficit	Rank
Manjeet	10 km freestyle	25:23.2	+4:16.7	23
Padma Namgail	10 km freestyle	25:57.7	+4:51.2	25
Rameez Ahmad Padder	10 km freestyle	25:01.5	+3:55.0	21
Shubham Parihar	10 km freestyle	25:20.9	+4:14.4	22
Manjeet; Padma Namgail; Rameez Ahmad Padder; Shubham Parihar	4 × 7.5 km relay	1:28:34.5	+16:24.9	7

Women

Athlete	Event	Total		
Athlete	Event	Time	Deficit	Rank
Bhayani Thekkada	5 km freestyle	18:10.4	+6:02.9	25

Sprint
Men

Athlete	Event	Qualification		Quarterfinals		Semifinals		Final	
Athlete	Event	Time	Rank	Time	Rank	Time	Rank	Time	Rank
Manjeet	Sprint classical	4:06.55	33	Did not advance					
Padma Namgail	Sprint classical	4:00.15	30 Q	3:47.95	6	Did not advance			
Rameez Ahmad Padder	Sprint classical	4:16.27	35	Did not advance					
Shubham Parihar	Sprint classical	4:18.91	36	Did not advance					

Women

Athlete	Event	Qualification		Quarterfinals		Semifinals		Final	
Athlete	Event	Time	Rank	Time	Rank	Time	Rank	Time	Rank
Bhayani Thekkada	Sprint classical	5:34.69	24 Q	4:94.64	5	Did not advance			

== Figure skating ==
India competed in the figure skating competitions. The team consists of two athletes.

Athlete(s)	Event	SP		FP		Total	
Athlete(s)	Event	Points	Rank	Points	Rank	Points	Rank
Manjesh Tiwari	Men's	28.15	15	48.26	15	76.41	15
Tara Prasad	Women's	49.17	8	99.17	7	148.34	8

== Ice hockey ==
=== Men's tournament ===
India qualified a men's hockey team of 23 athletes. The Indian team qualified after being invited following the initial announcement of the first 12 qualified teams.

Group stage

Pos	Team	Pld	W	OW	OL	L	GF	GA	GD	Pts	Qualification
1	Hong Kong	3	3	0	0	0	61	2	+59	9	Quarterfinals
2	Turkmenistan	3	2	0	0	1	46	6	+40	6	Placement 9–10
3	India	3	1	0	0	2	5	51	−46	3	Placement 11–12
4	Macau	3	0	0	0	3	3	56	−53	0	Placement 13–14

Source: OCA

5 February; 17:00	Hong Kong	30–0 (10–0, 12–0, 8–0)	India	Harbin Sport University Stadium, Harbin; Attendance: 569

Game reference

Cheung Ching Ho
Michael Gan
Goalies
Lotus Chamba
Namgail Tundup
Referee:
Konstantin Chubenko (KAZ)

B. Tang – 00:51	1–0
Elmer (Cheng) – 01:23	2–0
Chu – 05:44	3–0
Mak (J. Tang, Tong) – 08:05	4–0
B. Tang (Lee, Mak) – 09:22	5–0
Chu (B. Tang, Shum) – 10:21	6–0
Chu (B. Tang, Shum) – 18:28	7–0
Shum (Lee, Mak) – 19:06	8–0
Yam Ya. (Cheng) – 19:33	9–0
Elmer (Cheng, Yam Ya.) – 19:44	10–0
Tong (J. Tang, Ngan) – 20:52	11–0
Cheng (Y. Wong) (SH) – 23:25	12–0
Lee (Chu) – 26:23	13–0
Lee (J. Tang, Tong) (PP) – 29:50	14–0
Chu (Mak, B. Tang) – 30:17	15–0
B. Tang – 30:37	16–0
Tong (J. Tang, Leung) – 32:53	17–0
Y. Wong (Chu) – 34:04	18–0
Ngan (Yam Ya., Chan) – 36:39	19–0
Chu (J. Tang, Yuen) – 37:46	20–0
Wang (Cheng) – 38:21	21–0
Yam Ya. (Chu) (PP) – 39:57	22–0
Ngan (Shum, B. Tang) (PP) – 41:48	23–0
Chu (Yam Ya., To) – 42:02	24–0
Tong (J. Tang, Cheng) – 43:18	25–0
J. Tang (Cheng) – 43:46	26–0
Mak (Sham, Lee) (PP) – 49:40	27–0
B. Tang – 49:50	28–0
B. Tang (Chu) – 56:25	29–0
Tong (B. Tang, Wong K.) – 58:58	30–0

10 min
Penalties
12 min
85
Shots
1

6 February; 20:30	India	1–19 (1–4, 0–6, 0–9)	Turkmenistan	Harbin Ice Hockey Arena, Harbin; Attendance: 1,108

Game reference

Lotus Chamba
Namgail Tundup
Goalies
Keremli Çaryýew
Taňryberdi Guwanjow
Referee:
Li Ho Ching (HKG)

S. Angchok (Lakdan, Kunzang) – 01:41	1–0
	1–1	01:54 – Geldimyradow (Döwletmyradow, Esenow)
	1–2	02:09 – Geldimyradow (Esenow, Döwletmyradow)
	1–3	08:02 – Kakabaýew (Döwletmyradow, Esenow)
	1–4	12:41 – Baýmyradow (Aganyýazow) (SH)
	1–5	28:05 – Baýmyradow (Nuryýew, Aganyýazow)
	1–6	32:00 – Nuryýew (Aganyýazow) (PP)
	1–7	34:16 – Orazow (Kakaýew, Durdyýew)
	1–8	34:51 – Nuryýew
	1–9	37:03 – Esenow (Annasaparow, Döwletmyradow) (PP)
	1–10	39:21 – Döwletmyradow (Kakabaýew) (SH)
	1–11	43:25 – Döwletmyradow (Geldimyradow, Kakabaýew)
	1–12	45:25 – Wahowskiý (Gurbanow, Taňňyýew) (PP)
	1–13	47:08 – Baýmyradow (Nuryýew)
	1–14	47:28 – Geldimyradow (Döwletmyradow)
	1–15	47:51 – Geldimyradow (Döwletmyradow)
	1–16	49:56 – Döwletmyradow (Geldimyradow) (PP)
	1–17	53:03 – Baýhanow (Nuryýew, Aganyýazow)
	1–18	53:32 – Wahowskiý (Baýjaýew)
	1–19	57:18 – Geldimyradow (Kakabaýew, Döwletmyradow)

22 min
Penalties
14 min
5
Shots
89

9 February; 13:00	Macau	2–4 (0–2, 2–1, 0–1)	India	Harbin Ice Hockey Arena, Harbin; Attendance: 2,900

Game reference

Leung Manlong
Goalies
Lotus Chamba
Referee:
Faris Hakimin Yusoff (MAS)

	0–1	05:37 – Baba (Angchuk)
	0–2	12:24 – Ismail (A. Dorjay)
	0–3	27:50 – Angchuk (Angdus, Kunzang) (PP)
Sou (PP) – 33:05	1–3
Sou – 37:11	2–3
	2–4	47:40 – Angdus (T. Dorjay)

4 min
Penalties
14 min
23
Shots
42

Eleventh place game

10 February; 13:00	Singapore	13–2 (5–0, 3–1, 5–1)	India	Harbin Sport University Stadium, Harbin; Attendance: 565

Game reference

Joshua Lee
Lee Chin Hao
Goalies
Lotus Chamba
Referee:
Li Ho Ching (HKG)

Kodrowski (Chua, Qian) (PP) – 07:22	1–0
B. Lee (Chua, Chan) (PP) – 09:52	2–0
B. Lee (Kodrowski, Chua) – 11:46	3–0
Qian (SH) – 14:40	4–0
B. Lee (Blakney, Kodrowski) – 17:44	5–0
Wintland (B. Lee, Qian) – 28:06	6–0
Goh (Chan) – 33:09	7–0
Kok – 34:02	8–0
	8–1	39:01 – Ismail (S. Angchok, Lakdan)
	8–2	41:09 – Lotus (Ismail, S. Angchok) (PP)
B. Lee (Kok) – 45:57	9–2
Chan (Kodrowski, Qian) (PP) – 49:33	10–2
O'Brien (Blakney) – 51:00	11–2
Chan (Chew) – 53:37	12–2
Kok (B. Lee, Wintland) – 54:12	13–2

6 min
Penalties
10 min
60
Shots
11

== Short-track speed skating ==
Men

Athlete	Event	Heat		Quarterfinal		Semifinal		Final	
Athlete	Event	Time	Rank	Time	Rank	Time	Rank	Time	Rank
Prajwal Sharath	500 m	45.063	4	Did not advance					
Eklavya Jagal	500 m	44.384	3	Did not advance					
Akash Aradhya	500 m	46.144	5	Did not advance					
Akash Aradhya	1000 m	1:45.335	5	Did not advance					
Sohan Sudhir Tarkar	1000 m	1:40.344	4	Did not advance					
Prajwal Sharath	1000 m	1:35.991	3	Did not advance					
Noyal Charli Chevrian	1500 m	—N/a		2:52.916	6	Did not advance			
Eklavya Jagal	1500 m	—N/a		PEN		Did not advance			
Suyog Sanjay Tapkir	1500 m	—N/a		2:37.211	6	Did not advance			
Suyog Sanjay Tapkir; Prajwal Sharath; Akash Aradhya; Eklavya Jagal	5000 m relay	—N/a				7:45.117	4 FB	7:56.944	7

Women

Athlete	Event	Heat		Quarterfinal		Semifinal		Final	
Athlete	Event	Time	Rank	Time	Rank	Time	Rank	Time	Rank
Suvarnika Radhakrishnan	500 m	1:11.366	5	Did not advance					
Varsha Puranik	500 m	53.888	5	Did not advance					
Sravana Murthy	500 m	51.383	5	Did not advance					
Varsha Puranik	1000 m	1:49.271	4	Did not advance					
Dashiel Concessao	1000 m	1:51.620	5	Did not advance					
Swarali Deo	1000 m	1:54.962	5	Did not advance					
Suvarnika Radhakrishnan	1500 m	—N/a		3:04.736	5	Did not advance			
Sravana Murthy	1500 m	—N/a		2:56.634	5	Did not advance			
Raina Kukreja	1500 m	—N/a		3:17.216	5	Did not advance			
Varsha Puranik; Suvarnika Radhakrishnan; Dashiel Concessao; Sravana Murthy	3000 m relay	—N/a				5:16.173	3	Did not advance	

Mixed

Athlete	Event	Quarterfinal		Semifinal		Final	
Athlete	Event	Time	Rank	Time	Rank	Time	Rank
Dashiel Concessao; Sravana Murthy; Prajwal Sharath; Eklavya Jagal	2000 m relay	PEN		Did not advance			

Qualification legend: FA - Qualify to medal final; FB - Qualify to consolation final

== Speed skating ==
India entered nine speed skaters (seven men and two women).

Men

Athlete	Event	Time	Rank
Anubhav Gupta	100 m	11.59	21
Chandra Mouli Danda	100 m	10.83	17
Yogaraj Omkara	100 m	10.99	19
Srivatsa Srikantha Rao	100 m	11.10	20
Anubhav Gupta	500 m	43.09	20
Chandra Mouli Danda	500 m	38.97	17
Yogaraj Omkara	500 m	1:02.06	23
Srivatsa Srikantha Rao	500 m	40.58	19
Daniel Concessao	1000 m	1:25.35	21
Chandra Mouli Danda	1000 m	1:18.40	17
Yogaraj Omkara	1000 m	1:24.64	20
Srivatsa Srikantha Rao	1000 m	1:21.86	19
Chandra Danda	1500 m	2:02.41	16
Vishwaraj Jadeja	1500 m	2:05.80	18
Amitesh Mishra	1500 m	2:02.71	17
Srivatsa Srikantha Rao	1500 m	2:06.60	19
Dafnal Concessao	5000 m	8:28.76	15
Vishwaraj Jadeja	5000 m	7:47.31	14
Amitesh Mishra	5000 m	Disqualified	
Chandra Mouli Danda; Vishwaraj Jadeja; Amitesh Mishra	Team pursuit	4:29.32	5
Chandra Mouli Danda; Vishwaraj Jadeja; Amitesh Mishra	Team sprint	1:20.72	5

Women

Athlete	Event	Time	Rank
Diya Harsha Rao	100 m	13.21	18
Shruti Kotwal	100 m	11.68	16
Diya Harsha Rao	500 m	52.94	20
Shruti Kotwal	500 m	42.86	18
Diya Harsha Rao	1000 m	1:49.59	20
Shruti Kotwal	1000 m	1:28.59	18
