= Alpine skiing at the 2025 Asian Winter Games – Men's slalom =

Men's slalom at the 2025 Asian Winter Games
- Venue: Yabuli Ski Resort
- Dates: 9 February 2025
- Competitors: 58 from 22 nations

Medalists
gold medal	Takayuki Koyama	Japan
silver medal	Jung Dong-hyun	South Korea
bronze medal	Neo Kamada	Japan

The men's slalom at the 2025 Asian Winter Games was held on 9 February 2025 at Yabuli Ski Resort, Harbin, China.

Chencho Dorji of Bhutan competed in the event. However, due to issues with his FIS license, Dorji's results were not included in the official report. However, Dorji finished 23rd of 59 finishing skiers.

== Schedule ==
All times are China Standard Time (UTC+08:00)

Date	Time	Event
Sunday, 9 February 2025	10:00	Run 1
Sunday, 9 February 2025	12:00	Run 2

== Results ==
Legend

- DNF — Did not finish
- DSQ — Disqualified

Rank	Athlete	Run 1	Run 2	Total
1st place, gold medalist(s)	Takayuki Koyama (JPN)	44.83	43.29	1:28.12
2nd place, silver medalist(s)	Jung Dong-hyun (KOR)	45.01	44.08	1:29.09
3rd place, bronze medalist(s)	Neo Kamada (JPN)	44.74	44.51	1:29.25
4	Park Je-yun (KOR)	45.10	44.43	1:29.53
5	Jung Min-sik (KOR)	45.32	44.85	1:30.17
6	Arman Gayupov (UZB)	46.64	47.94	1:34.58
7	Liu Xiaochen (CHN)	48.50	47.05	1:35.55
8	Mohammad Kiadarbandsari (IRI)	48.80	47.02	1:35.82
9	Chao Xinbo (CHN)	48.27	47.98	1:36.25
10	Adrian Yung (HKG)	49.00	47.80	1:36.80
11	Zakhar Kuchin (KAZ)	49.29	47.95	1:37.24
12	Faiz Basha (SGP)	49.04	48.23	1:37.27
13	Sun Xinmiao (CHN)	50.18	49.19	1:39.37
14	Nikita Gorkovskiy (UZB)	50.66	49.72	1:40.38
15	Li Jinyang (CHN)	50.36	50.59	1:40.95
16	Ho Ping-jui (TPE)	53.24	50.48	1:43.72
17	Alex Astridge (UAE)	51.70	52.10	1:43.80
18	Evgeniy Timofeev (KGZ)	53.77	52.45	1:46.22
19	Lucas Wong (HKG)	54.15	53.42	1:47.57
20	Mayank Panwar (IND)	54.57	53.41	1:47.98
21	Nasyr Khurov (KGZ)	55.82	53.51	1:49.33
22	Tommi Aalto (THA)	54.01	55.52	1:49.53
23	Altanzulyn Ariunbat (MGL)	56.98	55.94	1:52.92
24	Pattarapol Saengdaeng (THA)	57.82	55.64	1:53.46
25	Arif Khan (IND)	56.40	57.08	1:53.48
26	Sunil Kumar (IND)	58.18	55.55	1:53.73
27	Kornkan Khampuengson (THA)	57.23	56.77	1:54.00
28	Erdenechuluuny Temüülen (MGL)	57.37	58.17	1:55.54
29	Saphal Ram Shrestha (NEP)	1:00.81	58.05	1:58.86
30	Sharif Zawaideh (JOR)	1:01.60	59.71	2:01.31
31	Lu Kin Pok (HKG)	1:00.96	1:01.55	2:02.51
32	Saidashraf Eshonov (TJK)	1:00.93	1:01.95	2:02.88
33	Mirali Marufjoni (TJK)	1:01.79	1:03.23	2:05.02
34	Anthony Mrad (LBN)	1:04.34	1:03.99	2:07.43
35	Mahmadrajab Kholiqov (TJK)	1:03.55	1:05.65	2:09.20
36	Abdallah Al-Balushi (UAE)	1:08.28	1:07.50	2:15.78
37	Ikromiddin Abdullozoda (TJK)	1:09.55	1:08.35	2:17.90
38	Abdulrahman Al-Wahibi (KUW)	1:21.34	1:18.52	2:39.86
39	Faris Al-Obaid (KUW)	1:23.90	1:21.72	2:45.62
—	Hong Dong-kwan (KOR)	45.05	DNF	DNF
—	Baqir Hussain (IND)	58.59	DNF	DNF
—	Arata Yamanaka (JPN)	45.20	DSQ	DSQ
—	Alexey Kulakov (KAZ)	50.95	DSQ	DSQ
—	Tsai Yueh-sheng (TPE)	53.23	DSQ	DSQ
—	Muhammad Karim (PAK)	55.74	DSQ	DSQ
—	Jinro Kirikubo (JPN)	DNF		DNF
—	Danil Syssoyev (KAZ)	DNF		DNF
—	Rostislav Khokhlov (KAZ)	DNF		DNF
—	Denis Koniukhov (KGZ)	DNF		DNF
—	Fayik Abdi (KSA)	DNF		DNF
—	Ziad Shehab (LBN)	DNF		DNF
—	Temüülengiin Tsogjavkhlan (MGL)	DNF		DNF
—	Chhowang Mingyur Tamang (NEP)	DNF		DNF
—	Thotsawat Nokyaem (THA)	DNF		DNF
—	Hassan Al-Fardan (UAE)	DNF		DNF
—	Medet Nazarov (UZB)	DNF		DNF
—	Otgonbayaryn Ösökh-Ireedüi (MGL)	DSQ		DSQ
—	Francis Ceccarelli (PHI)	DSQ		DSQ
