= Figure skating at the 2025 Asian Winter Games =

Figure skating competitions at the 2025 Asian Winter Games

- Venue: Heilongjiang Multifunctional Hall
- Dates: 11–13 February 2025
- Competitors: 65 from 16 nations

Figure skating competitions at the 2025 Asian Winter Games in Harbin, China, were held at the Heilongjiang Ice Events Training Centre Multifunctional Hall between 11 and 13 February 2025.

Skaters competed in four disciplines: men's singles, ladies' singles, pairs, and ice dance.

== Schedule ==
S	Short program	F	Free skating

Event↓/Date →	11th Tue	12th Wed	13th Thu
Men's singles	S		F
Women's singles		S	F
Pairs	S	F	
Ice dance	S	F	

== Medalists ==
Event	Gold	Silver	Bronze
Men's singles	Cha Jun-hwan; South Korea	Yuma Kagiyama; Japan	Mikhail Shaidorov; Kazakhstan
Women's singles	Kim Chae-yeon; South Korea	Kaori Sakamoto; Japan	Hana Yoshida; Japan
Pairs	Uzbekistan; Dmitrii Chigirev; Ekaterina Geynish	North Korea; Han Kum-chol; Ryom Tae-ok	Japan; Sumitada Moriguchi; Yuna Nagaoka
Ice dance	Japan; Masaya Morita; Utana Yoshida	China; Xing Jianing; Ren Junfei	Japan; Shingo Nishiyama; Azusa Tanaka

== Medal table ==
Rank	Nation	Gold	Silver	Bronze	Total
1	South Korea (KOR)	2	0	0	2
2	Japan (JPN)	1	2	3	6
3	Uzbekistan (UZB)	1	0	0	1
4	China (CHN)	0	1	0	1
4	North Korea (PRK)	0	1	0	1
6	Kazakhstan (KAZ)	0	0	1	1
Totals (6 entries)		4	4	4	12

== Participating nations ==
A total of 65 athletes from 16 nations competed in figure skating at the 2025 Asian Winter Games:

- China (10)
- Chinese Taipei (1)
- Hong Kong (4)
- India (2)
- Indonesia (3)
- Japan (12)
- Kazakhstan (6)
- Kyrgyzstan (1)
- Malaysia (4)
- Mongolia (2)
- North Korea (3)
- Philippines (5)
- South Korea (4)
- Thailand (2)
- Turkmenistan (2)
- Uzbekistan (4)
