= Chencho Dorji (skier) =

Bhutanese skier

Personal information
- Full name: Chencho Dorji Wowkonowicz
- National team: France (until 2025); Bhutan (since 2025)
- Born: 21 February 1998 (age 28) Thimphu, Bhutan

Skiing career
- Sport: Alpine skiing ♂
- Club: Laïque Lyonnais
- Disciplines: Slalom

Chencho Dorji Wowkonowicz is a Bhutanese alpine skier who was the first athlete to represent Bhutan at the Asian Winter Games.

== Early years ==
Chencho Dorji was born on 21 February 1998 in Thimphu, Bhutan but was adopted by French mountain guide Snafu Wowkonowicz at age two and moved to France. He alternated living in Chamonix and Paris. Wowkonowicz taught him alpine skiing. He studied at the University of Lyon.

== Career ==
At 18 years old, Dorji enrolled at the National Ski Diploma. He joined the Union nationale des centres sportifs de plein air. After watching the 2022 Winter Olympics, he decided to pursue a goal to qualify for the next Olympics competitor as an athlete for Bhutan.

Dorji became the very first athlete to represent Bhutan at the Winter Asian Games at the 2025 edition in Harbin, China.

Due to issues with his FIS license, Dorji's results was not included in the official report. He nevertheless took part at the men's slalom event, and his time would have placed 23rd.
