= Tariel Zharkymbaev =

Kyrgyzstani cross-country skier (born 1996)

Personal information
- Nationality: Kyrgyzstani
- Born: 17 September 1996 (age 28)

Sport
- Sport: Cross-country skiing

Tariel Zharkymbaev (born 17 September 1996) is a Kyrgyzstani cross-country skier. He competed in the 2018 Winter Olympics.
