= Wang Qiang (skier) =

Chinese cross-country skier (born 1993)

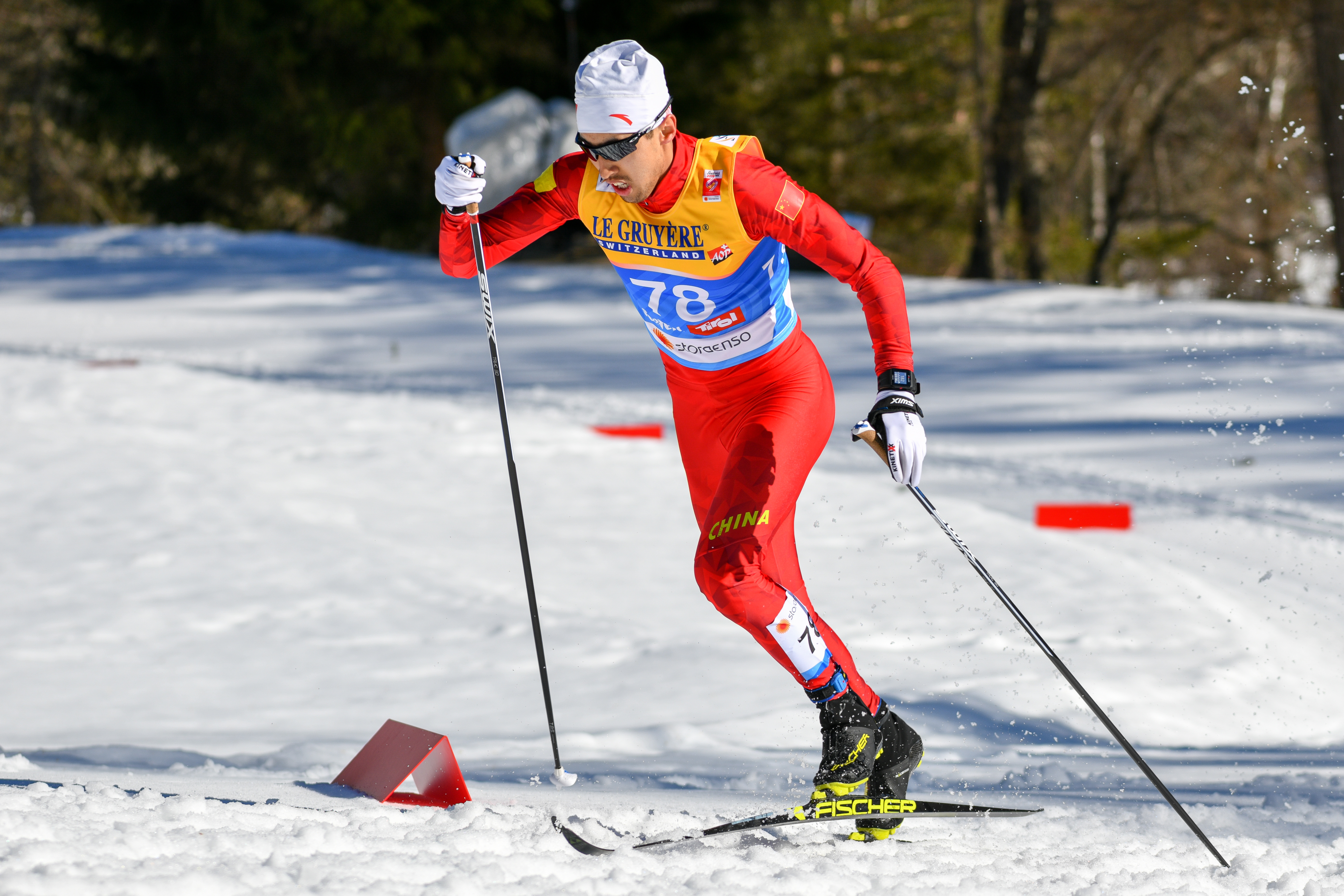

Personal information
- Nationality: China
- Born: 23 April 1993 (age 33) Yichun, Jiangxi, China

Sport
- Sport: Skiing

World Cup career
- Seasons: 4 – (2018–2020, 2022–present)
- Indiv. starts: 17
- Indiv. podiums: 1
- Indiv. wins: 0
- Team starts: 3
- Team podiums: 0
- Overall titles: 0 – (36th in 2022)
- Discipline titles: 0
Medal record
Men's cross-country skiing
Representing China
Asian Games
Gold medal – first place	2025 Harbin	Sprint
- Updated on 20 March 2022

Wang Qiang
- Simplified Chinese: 王强
- Traditional Chinese: 王強
Transcriptions
Standard Mandarin
- Hanyu Pinyin: Wáng Qiáng
- IPA: [wǎŋ tɕʰjǎŋ]

Wang Qiang (Chinese: 王强; pinyin: Wáng Qiáng; Mandarin pronunciation: [wǎŋ tɕʰjǎŋ]; born 23 April 1993) is a Chinese cross-country skier. He competed in the 2018 and 2022 Winter Olympics. Wang finished 2nd at the World Cup sprint race in Drammen, Norway on March 3, 2022, making him the first Chinese athlete to ever ascend the podium in a World Cup competition. By the end of the season he finished 36th in the World Cup league table, putting him ahead of Liu Yuanyuan to become the best Chinese cross-country skier of all time.

== Cross-country skiing results ==
All results are sourced from the International Ski Federation (FIS).

=== Olympic Games ===
Year	Age	15 km individual	30 km skiathlon	50 km mass start	Sprint	4 × 10 km relay	Team sprint
2018	24	DSQ	63	59	67	—	27
2022	28	—	—	46^{[a]}	30	13	13

^{a} Distance reduced to 30 km due to weather conditions.

=== World Championships ===
Year	Age	15 km individual	30 km skiathlon	50 km mass start	Sprint	4 × 10 km relay	Team sprint
2019	25	72	—	—	28	13	21

=== World Cup ===
==== Season standings ====
Season	Age	Discipline standings			Ski Tour standings			
Season	Age	Overall	Distance	Sprint	Nordic Opening	Tour de Ski	Ski Tour 2020	World Cup Final
2018	24	NC	NC	NC	DNF	—	—N/a	—
2019	25	NC	NC	NC	—	—	—N/a	—
2020	26	105	—	65	—	—	—	—N/a
2022	28	36	—	12	—N/a	—	—N/a	—N/a

==== Individual podiums ====
- 1 podium – (1 WC, 0 SWC)

No.	Season	Date	Location	Race	Level	Place
1	2021–22	3 March 2022	Drammen, Norway	1.2 km Sprint C	World Cup	2nd
