= Haruki Yamashita =

Japanese cross-country skier

Personal information
- Born: 11 March 1999 (age 27)
- Height: 170 cm (5 ft 7 in)
- Weight: 67 kg (148 lb)

Sport
- Country: Japan
- Sport: Cross-country skiing
Medal record
Men's cross-country skiing
Representing Japan
Asian Games
Gold medal – first place	2025 Harbin	10 km freestyle

Haruki Yamashita (Japanese: 山下 陽暉, born 11 March 1999) is a Japanese cross-country skier who competes internationally.

He represented his country at the 2022 Winter Olympics.
