= Takatsugu Uda =

Japanese cross country skier (born 1991)

Personal information
- Born: 25 October 1991 (age 34)
- Height: 175 cm (5 ft 9 in)

Sport
- Sport: Skiing
- Club: Tokai University
Medal record
Men's cross-country skiing
Representing Japan
Asian Games
Silver medal – second place	2025 Harbin	10 km freestyle

Takatsugu Uda (Japanese: 宇田崇二, born 25 October 1991) is a Japanese cross-country skier. He represented Japan at the FIS Nordic World Ski Championships 2015 in Falun.
