= Short-track speed skating at the 2025 Asian Winter Games =

Short-track speed skating competitions at the 2025 Asian Winter Games

- Venue: Heilongjiang Multifunctional Hall
- Dates: 7–9 February 2025
- Competitors: 95 from 17 nations

Short-track speed skating competitions at the 2025 Asian Winter Games in Harbin, China, were held at the Heilongjiang Ice Events Training Centre Multifunctional Hall between 7–9 February, 2025.

== Schedule ==
H	Heats	Q	Quarterfinals	S	Semifinals	F	Finals

Event↓/Date →	7th Fri		8th Sat			9th Sun		
Men's 500 m	H		Q	S	F			
Men's 1000 m	H					Q	S	F
Men's 1500 m	Q		S	F				
Men's 5000 m relay						S	F	
Women's 500 m	H		Q	S	F			
Women's 1000 m	H					Q	S	F
Women's 1500 m	Q		S	F				
Women's 3000 m relay						S	F	
Mixed 2000 m relay	Q	S	F					

== Medalists ==
=== Men ===
Event	Gold	Silver	Bronze
500 m	Lin Xiaojun; China	Park Ji-won; South Korea	Jang Sung-woo; South Korea
1000 m	Jang Sung-woo; South Korea	Park Ji-won; South Korea	Liu Shaoang; China
1500 m	Park Ji-won; South Korea	Lin Xiaojun; China	Jang Sung-woo; South Korea
5000 m relay	Kazakhstan; Gleb Ivchenko; Denis Nikisha; Mersaid Zhaxybayev; Adil Galiakhmetov; Aibek Nassen; Abzal Azhgaliyev	Japan; Shun Saito; Daito Ochi; Shuta Matsuzu; Tsubasa Furukawa; Osuke Irie; Kota Kikuchi	China; Liu Shaoang; Lin Xiaojun; Sun Long; Liu Shaolin; Zhu Yiding; Li Wenlong

=== Women ===
Event	Gold	Silver	Bronze
500 m	Choi Min-jeong; South Korea	Kim Gil-li; South Korea	Lee So-yeon; South Korea
1000 m	Choi Min-jeong; South Korea	Kim Gil-li; South Korea	Zhang Chutong; China
1500 m	Kim Gil-li; South Korea	Gong Li; China	Zang Yize; China
3000 m relay	China; Fan Kexin; Gong Li; Zhang Chutong; Wang Xinran; Zang Yize; Yang Jingru	Kazakhstan; Olga Tikhonova; Yana Khan; Alina Azhgaliyeva; Malika Yermek; Zeinep Kumarkan; Madina Zhanbussinova	Japan; Rina Shimada; Yuki Ishikawa; Haruna Nagamori; Riho Inuzuka; Miyu Miyashita; Kurumi Shimane

=== Mixed ===
Event	Gold	Silver	Bronze
2000 m relay	South Korea; Kim Gil-li; Choi Min-jeong; Park Ji-won; Kim Tae-sung; Jang Sung-woo; Noh Do-hee; Shim Suk-hee; Kim Gun-woo	Kazakhstan; Yana Khan; Malika Yermek; Denis Nikisha; Adil Galiakhmetov; Alina Azhgaliyeva; Olga Tikhonova; Mersaid Zhaxybayev; Abzal Azhgaliyev	Japan; Rina Shimada; Riho Inuzuka; Shun Saito; Tsubasa Furukawa; Yuki Ishikawa; Shuta Matsuzu; Miyu Miyashita; Kota Kikuchi

== Medal table ==
Rank	Nation	Gold	Silver	Bronze	Total
1	South Korea (KOR)	6	4	3	13
2	China (CHN)	2	2	4	8
3	Kazakhstan (KAZ)	1	2	0	3
4	Japan (JPN)	0	1	2	3
Totals (4 entries)		9	9	9	27

== Participating nations ==
A total of 95 athletes from 17 nations competed in short-track speed skating at the 2025 Asian Winter Games:

- China (12)
- Chinese Taipei (6)
- Hong Kong (6)
- India (12)
- Indonesia (2)
- Japan (12)
- Kazakhstan (12)
- Malaysia (2)
- Mongolia (4)
- Philippines (1)
- Qatar (1)
- Singapore (4)
- South Korea (12)
- Thailand (6)
- Turkmenistan (1)
- Uzbekistan (1)
- Vietnam (1)
