= Short-track speed skating at the 2025 Asian Winter Games – Mixed 2000 metre relay =

Mixed 2000 metre relay at the 2025 Asian Winter Games
- Venue: Heilongjiang Multifunctional Hall
- Dates: 7–8 February 2025
- Competitors: 52 from 9 nations

Medalists
gold medal	South Korea; Kim Gil-li, Choi Min-jeong, Park Ji-won, Kim Tae-sung, Jang Sung-woo, Noh Do-hee, Shim Suk-hee, Kim Gun-woo
silver medal	Kazakhstan; Yana Khan, Malika Yermek, Denis Nikisha, Adil Galiakhmetov, Alina Azhgaliyeva, Olga Tikhonova, Mersaid Zhaxybayev, Abzal Azhgaliyev
bronze medal	Japan; Rina Shimada, Riho Inuzuka, Shun Saito, Tsubasa Furukawa, Yuki Ishikawa, Shuta Matsuzu, Miyu Miyashita, Kota Kikuchi

The mixed 2000 metre relay competition in short-track speed skating at the 2025 Asian Winter Games was held on 7 and 8 February 2025 in Harbin, China.

== Schedule ==
All times are China Standard Time (UTC+08:00)

Date	Time	Event
Friday, 7 February 2025	12:11	Quarterfinals
Friday, 7 February 2025	12:44	Semifinals
Saturday, 8 February 2025	10:00	Finals

== Results ==
Legend

- PEN — Penalty

=== Quarterfinals ===
- Qualification: 1–2 + Two best 3 → Semifinals (Q + q)

==== Heat 1 ====
Rank	Team	Time	Notes
1	Kazakhstan (KAZ); Olga Tikhonova; Malika Yermek; Mersaid Zhaxybayev; Abzal Azhgaliyev	2:45.431	Q
2	Japan (JPN); Miyu Miyashita; Riho Inuzuka; Kota Kikuchi; Tsubasa Furukawa	2:46.930	Q
3	Chinese Taipei (TPE); Chung Hsiao-ying; Chang Wan-ting; Lin Chun-chieh; Chang Chuan-lin	2:51.211	q

==== Heat 2 ====
Rank	Team	Time	Notes
1	China (CHN); Fan Kexin; Zhang Chutong; Sun Long; Liu Shaolin	2:46.652	Q
2	Thailand (THA); Thanutchaya Chatthaisong; Punpreeda Prempreecha; Chonlachart Taprom; Phooripat Changmai	2:50.870	Q
—	Hong Kong (HKG); Lam Ching Yan; Nicole Law; Kwok Tsz Fung; Sidney Chu	PEN	

==== Heat 3 ====
Rank	Team	Time	Notes
1	South Korea (KOR); Noh Do-hee; Shim Suk-hee; Kim Tae-sung; Kim Gun-woo	2:43.938	Q
2	Singapore (SGP); Amelia Chua; Alyssa Pok; Ong Ryo Yik; Brandon Pok	2:59.264	Q
—	India (IND); Dashiel Concessao; Sai Sahana; Prajwal Sharath; Eklavya Jagal	PEN	

=== Semifinals ===
- Qualification: 1–2 → Final A (QA), 3–4 → Final B (QB)

==== Heat 1 ====
Rank	Team	Time	Notes
1	South Korea (KOR); Kim Gil-li; Choi Min-jeong; Park Ji-won; Jang Sung-woo	2:39.319	QA
2	Japan (JPN); Rina Shimada; Yuki Ishikawa; Shun Saito; Shuta Matsuzu	2:44.956	QA
3	Thailand (THA); Thanutchaya Chatthaisong; Punpreeda Prempreecha; Chonlachart Taprom; Phooripat Changmai	2:49.402	QB

==== Heat 2 ====
Rank	Team	Time	Notes
1	China (CHN); Fan Kexin; Wang Xinran; Lin Xiaojun; Liu Shaolin	2:40.241	QA
2	Kazakhstan (KAZ); Yana Khan; Alina Azhgaliyeva; Denis Nikisha; Adil Galiakhmetov	2:46.491	QA
3	Chinese Taipei (TPE); Chung Hsiao-ying; Chang Wan-ting; Lin Chun-chieh; Chang Chuan-lin	2:51.766	QB
4	Singapore (SGP); Amelia Chua; Alyssa Pok; Ong Ryo Yik; Brandon Pok	2:55.981	QB

=== Finals ===
==== Final B ====
Rank	Team	Time
1	Thailand (THA); Thanutchaya Chatthaisong; Punpreeda Prempreecha; Chonlachart Taprom; Phooripat Changmai	3:02.320
2	Singapore (SGP); Amelia Chua; Alyssa Pok; Ong Ryo Yik; Brandon Pok	3:04.321
—	Chinese Taipei (TPE); Chung Hsiao-ying; Chang Wan-ting; Lin Chun-chieh; Chang Chuan-lin	PEN

==== Final A ====
Rank	Team	Time
1st place, gold medalist(s)	South Korea (KOR); Kim Gil-li; Choi Min-jeong; Park Ji-won; Kim Tae-sung	2:41.534
2nd place, silver medalist(s)	Kazakhstan (KAZ); Yana Khan; Malika Yermek; Denis Nikisha; Adil Galiakhmetov	2:42.258
3rd place, bronze medalist(s)	Japan (JPN); Rina Shimada; Riho Inuzuka; Shun Saito; Tsubasa Furukawa	2:44.058
4	China (CHN); Fan Kexin; Gong Li; Liu Shaoang; Lin Xiaojun	2:59.017
