= Short-track speed skating at the 2025 Asian Winter Games – Men's 500 metres =

Men's 500 metres at the 2025 Asian Winter Games
- Venue: Heilongjiang Multifunctional Hall
- Dates: 7–8 February 2025
- Competitors: 37 from 17 nations

Medalists
gold medal	Lin Xiaojun	China
silver medal	Park Ji-won	South Korea
bronze medal	Jang Sung-woo	South Korea

The men's 500 metres competition in short-track speed skating at the 2025 Asian Winter Games was held on 7 and 8 February 2025 in Harbin, China.

== Schedule ==
All times are China Standard Time (UTC+08:00)

Date	Time	Event
Friday, 7 February 2025	10:25	Heats
Saturday, 8 February 2025	12:14	Quarterfinals
Saturday, 8 February 2025	12:49	Semifinals
Saturday, 8 February 2025	13:21	Finals

== Results ==
Legend

- PEN — Penalty

=== Heats ===
- Qualification: 1–2 + Four best 3 → Quarterfinals (Q + q)

==== Heat 1 ====
Rank	Athlete	Time	Notes
1	Jang Sung-woo (KOR)	42.258	Q
2	Peter Groseclose (PHI)	42.562	Q
3	Sidney Chu (HKG)	44.240	
4	Pena Ataýew (TKM)	52.461	

==== Heat 2 ====
Rank	Athlete	Time	Notes
1	Lin Xiaojun (CHN)	41.337	Q
2	Kota Kikuchi (JPN)	42.896	Q
3	Chonlachart Taprom (THA)	42.975	q
4	Ameer Iman Fadzli (MAS)	49.633	
5	Mohammed Al-Abdulla (QAT)	1:05.864	

==== Heat 3 ====
Rank	Athlete	Time	Notes
1	Sun Long (CHN)	41.107	Q
2	Daniil Eybog (UZB)	41.143	Q
3	Lai Tsai Huan-chen (TPE)	43.870	q
4	Marva Kayana Putra Firdaus (INA)	43.898	
5	Kwok Tsz Ho (HKG)	46.970	

==== Heat 4 ====
Rank	Athlete	Time	Notes
1	Mersaid Zhaxybayev (KAZ)	41.871	Q
2	Tsubasa Furukawa (JPN)	41.905	Q
3	Ong Ryo Yik (SGP)	43.741	q
4	Prakit Borvornmongkolsak (THA)	44.010	

==== Heat 5 ====
Rank	Athlete	Time	Notes
1	Abzal Azhgaliyev (KAZ)	42.026	Q
2	Chang Chuan-lin (TPE)	42.561	Q
3	Erdenebilegiin Mönkh-Erdene (MGL)	44.610	
4	Prajwal Sharath (IND)	45.063	

==== Heat 6 ====
Rank	Athlete	Time	Notes
1	Denis Nikisha (KAZ)	42.702	Q
2	Kwok Tsz Fung (HKG)	44.242	Q
3	Eklavya Jagal (IND)	44.384	
4	Arsa Mizan Putra Firdaus (INA)	46.054	
5	Mönkhbayaryn Borkhüü (MGL)	59.092	

==== Heat 7 ====
Rank	Athlete	Time	Notes
1	Park Ji-won (KOR)	41.461	Q
2	Shuta Matsuzu (JPN)	42.129	Q
3	Lin Chun-chieh (TPE)	43.087	q
4	Chirawat Phonkat (THA)	44.955	
5	Dương Trường Lập (VIE)	52.899	

==== Heat 8 ====
Rank	Athlete	Time	Notes
1	Liu Shaoang (CHN)	41.326	Q
2	Kim Tae-sung (KOR)	41.404	Q
3	Brandon Pok (SGP)	44.154	
4	Garmaagiin Mönkh-Erdene (MGL)	44.829	
5	Akash Aradhya (IND)	46.144	

=== Quarterfinals ===
- Qualification: 1–2 + Two best 3 → Quarterfinals (Q + q)

==== Heat 1 ====
Rank	Athlete	Time	Notes
1	Sun Long (CHN)	40.873	Q
2	Denis Nikisha (KAZ)	41.129	Q
3	Daniil Eybog (UZB)	41.350	q
4	Chonlachart Taprom (THA)	43.827	
5	Kwok Tsz Fung (HKG)	44.527	

==== Heat 2 ====
Rank	Athlete	Time	Notes
1	Kim Tae-sung (KOR)	40.509	Q
2	Jang Sung-woo (KOR)	40.735	Q
3	Liu Shaoang (CHN)	40.933	q
4	Lin Chun-chieh (TPE)	43.504	
5	Kota Kikuchi (JPN)	43.996	

==== Heat 3 ====
Rank	Athlete	Time	Notes
1	Lin Xiaojun (CHN)	41.325	Q
2	Abzal Azhgaliyev (KAZ)	41.876	Q
3	Peter Groseclose (PHI)	42.331	
4	Tsubasa Furukawa (JPN)	42.601	
5	Ong Ryo Yik (SGP)	44.349	

==== Heat 4 ====
Rank	Athlete	Time	Notes
1	Park Ji-won (KOR)	41.240	Q
2	Shuta Matsuzu (JPN)	41.615	Q
3	Mersaid Zhaxybayev (KAZ)	41.704	
4	Chang Chuan-lin (TPE)	42.023	
5	Lai Tsai Huan-chen (TPE)	44.057	

=== Semifinals ===
- Qualification: 1–2 + Best 3 → Final A (QA), Next best five → Final B (QB)

==== Heat 1 ====
Rank	Athlete	Time	Notes
1	Kim Tae-sung (KOR)	40.509	QA
2	Sun Long (CHN)	40.667	QA
3	Jang Sung-woo (KOR)	40.703	QA
4	Shuta Matsuzu (JPN)	41.178	QB
5	Liu Shaoang (CHN)	1:24.670	QB

==== Heat 2 ====
Rank	Athlete	Time	Notes
1	Lin Xiaojun (CHN)	40.930	QA
2	Park Ji-won (KOR)	41.329	QA
3	Daniil Eybog (UZB)	41.431	QB
4	Abzal Azhgaliyev (KAZ)	41.514	QB
—	Denis Nikisha (KAZ)	PEN	

=== Finals ===
==== Final B ====
Rank	Athlete	Time
1	Liu Shaoang (CHN)	42.386
2	Daniil Eybog (UZB)	42.457
3	Abzal Azhgaliyev (KAZ)	42.571
—	Shuta Matsuzu (JPN)	PEN

==== Final A ====
Rank	Athlete	Time
1st place, gold medalist(s)	Lin Xiaojun (CHN)	41.150
2nd place, silver medalist(s)	Park Ji-won (KOR)	41.398
3rd place, bronze medalist(s)	Jang Sung-woo (KOR)	41.442
4	Sun Long (CHN)	42.676
—	Kim Tae-sung (KOR)	PEN
