= Short-track speed skating at the 2025 Asian Winter Games – Men's 1500 metres =

Men's 1500 metres at the 2025 Asian Winter Games
- Venue: Heilongjiang Multifunctional Hall
- Dates: 7–8 February 2025
- Competitors: 36 from 16 nations

Medalists
gold medal	Park Ji-won	South Korea
silver medal	Lin Xiaojun	China
bronze medal	Jang Sung-woo	South Korea

The men's 1500 metres competition in short-track speed skating at the 2025 Asian Winter Games was held on 7 and 8 February 2025 in Harbin, China.

== Schedule ==
All times are China Standard Time (UTC+08:00)

Date	Time	Event
Friday, 7 February 2025	09:25	Quarterfinals
Saturday, 8 February 2025	10:46	Semifinals
Saturday, 8 February 2025	11:33	Finals

== Results ==
Legend

- ADV — Advanced
- DNS — Did not start
- PEN — Penalty

=== Quarterfinals ===
- Qualification: 1–3 + Three best 4 → Semifinals (Q + q)

==== Heat 1 ====
Rank	Athlete	Time	Notes
1	Park Ji-won (KOR)	2:21.118	Q
2	Phooripat Changmai (THA)	2:24.500	Q
3	Sidney Chu (HKG)	2:24.516	Q
4	Lai Tsai Huan-chen (TPE)	2:24.848	ADV
5	Mohammed Al-Abdulla (QAT)	No time	
—	Osuke Irie (JPN)	PEN	

==== Heat 2 ====
Rank	Athlete	Time	Notes
1	Sun Long (CHN)	2:30.516	Q
2	Gleb Ivchenko (KAZ)	2:30.602	Q
3	Daniil Eybog (UZB)	2:30.611	Q
4	Erdenebilegiin Mönkh-Erdene (MGL)	2:33.000	
5	Kwok Tsz Ho (HKG)	2:34.361	
6	Dương Trường Lập (VIE)	3:05.572	

==== Heat 3 ====
Rank	Athlete	Time	Notes
1	Jang Sung-woo (KOR)	2:19.505	Q
2	Chonlachart Taprom (THA)	2:20.864	Q
3	Chang Chuan-lin (TPE)	2:20.956	Q
4	Kwok Tsz Fung (HKG)	2:21.135	q
5	Garmaagiin Mönkh-Erdene (MGL)	2:27.762	
6	Noyal Charli Cherian (IND)	2:52.916	

==== Heat 4 ====
Rank	Athlete	Time	Notes
1	Kim Gun-woo (KOR)	2:24.076	Q
2	Brandon Pok (SGP)	2:25.935	Q
3	Tsai Chia-wei (TPE)	2:27.367	Q
4	Mönkhbayaryn Borkhüü (MGL)	2:40.852	
5	Chirawat Phonkat (THA)	2:51.360	
—	Eklavya Jagal (IND)	PEN	

==== Heat 5 ====
Rank	Athlete	Time	Notes
1	Adil Galiakhmetov (KAZ)	2:29.920	Q
2	Lin Xiaojun (CHN)	2:29.944	Q
3	Daito Ochi (JPN)	2:30.136	Q
4	Ong Ryo Yik (SGP)	2:31.826	
5	Marva Kayana Putra Firdaus (INA)	2:34.706	
—	Ameer Iman Fadzli (MAS)	DNS	

==== Heat 6 ====
Rank	Athlete	Time	Notes
1	Liu Shaoang (CHN)	2:16.538	Q
2	Denis Nikisha (KAZ)	2:16.863	Q
3	Shun Saito (JPN)	2:16.933	Q
4	Peter Groseclose (PHI)	2:19.318	q
5	Arsa Mizan Putra Firdaus (INA)	2:32.305	
6	Suyog Sanjay Tapkir (IND)	2:37.211	

=== Semifinals ===
- Qualification: 1–2 + Best 3 → Final A (QA), Next best seven → Final B (QB)

==== Heat 1 ====
Rank	Athlete	Time	Notes
1	Sun Long (CHN)	2:31.689	QA
2	Liu Shaoang (CHN)	2:31.720	QA
3	Denis Nikisha (KAZ)	2:31.890	QB
4	Shun Saito (JPN)	2:32.006	QB
5	Gleb Ivchenko (KAZ)	2:32.129	
6	Peter Groseclose (PHI)	2:32.668	
7	Daniil Eybog (UZB)	3:06.877	

==== Heat 2 ====
Rank	Athlete	Time	Notes
1	Lin Xiaojun (CHN)	2:25.880	QA
2	Jang Sung-woo (KOR)	2:25.937	QA
3	Adil Galiakhmetov (KAZ)	2:25.993	QB
4	Daito Ochi (JPN)	2:26.370	QB
5	Chang Chuan-lin (TPE)	2:27.885	
6	Kwok Tsz Fung (HKG)	2:28.550	
7	Chonlachart Taprom (THA)	2:28.614	

==== Heat 3 ====
Rank	Athlete	Time	Notes
1	Park Ji-won (KOR)	2:18.000	QA
2	Kim Gun-woo (KOR)	2:18.133	QA
3	Tsai Chia-wei (TPE)	2:22.258	QA
4	Lai Tsai Huan-chen (TPE)	2:23.794	QB
5	Brandon Pok (SGP)	2:25.294	QB
6	Sidney Chu (HKG)	2:50.806	ADVB
—	Phooripat Changmai (THA)	PEN	

=== Finals ===
==== Final B ====
Rank	Athlete	Time
1	Adil Galiakhmetov (KAZ)	2:29.565
2	Daito Ochi (JPN)	2:29.643
3	Shun Saito (JPN)	2:29.744
4	Brandon Pok (SGP)	2:31.915
5	Sidney Chu (HKG)	2:32.786
6	Lai Tsai Huan-chen (TPE)	2:33.760
—	Denis Nikisha (KAZ)	DNS

==== Final A ====
Rank	Athlete	Time
1st place, gold medalist(s)	Park Ji-won (KOR)	2:16.927
2nd place, silver medalist(s)	Lin Xiaojun (CHN)	2:16.956
3rd place, bronze medalist(s)	Jang Sung-woo (KOR)	2:17.057
4	Kim Gun-woo (KOR)	2:17.160
5	Liu Shaoang (CHN)	2:18.661
6	Sun Long (CHN)	2:20.064
7	Tsai Chia-wei (TPE)	2:24.309
