= 2022–23 ISU Short Track Speed Skating World Cup =

Multi-race tournament over a season for short track speed skating

- Dates: 28 October 2022 – 12 February 2023

The 2022–23 ISU Short Track Speed Skating World Cup is a multi-race tournament over a season for short track speed skating. The season began on 28 October 2022 in Canada and ended on 12 February 2023 in Netherlands. The World Cup is organised by the ISU who also runs world cups and championships in speed skating and figure skating.

The World Cup consisted of six competitions this year, with China organizing the third and fourth event originally but was forced to cancel due to international competitors' discontent with the closed loop system under the zero covid policy.

The six competitions have a single distance character across nine distances:

Men

- Individual: 500, 1000 and 1500 meters
- Team Relay: Men 5000 meters

Woman

- Individual: 500, 1000 and 1500 meters
- Team Relay: Women 3000 meters

Mixed

- Team Relay: Mixed Gender 2000 meters

== Calendar ==
=== Men ===
==== Montreal 28-30 October 2022 ====
Date	Place	Distance	Winner	Second	Third	Reference
30 October 2022	Maurice Richard Arena	500m	(Canada) Steven Dubois	(South Korea) Lee June-seo	(Italy) Pietro Sighel	
30 October 2022	Maurice Richard Arena	1000m (1)	(Latvia) Roberts Krūzbergs	(South Korea) Lim Yong-jin	(Netherlands) Teun Boer	
30 October 2022	Maurice Richard Arena	1000m (2)	(Canada) Pascal Dion	(South Korea) Hong Kyung-hwan	(South Korea) Kim Tae-sung	
30 October 2022	Maurice Richard Arena	1500m	(South Korea) Park Ji-won	(Canada) Steven Dubois	(South Korea) Hong Kyung-hwan	
30 October 2022	Maurice Richard Arena	5000m relay	South Korea	Kazakhstan	Canada	

==== Salt Lake City 4-6 November 2022 ====
Date	Place	Distance	Winner	Second	Third	Reference
5 November 2022	Utah Olympic Oval	500m (1)	(Canada) Maxime Laoun	(Kazakhstan) Abzal Azhgaliyev	(South Korea) Lee June-seo	
6 November 2022	Utah Olympic Oval	500m (2)	(Netherlands) Jens van 't Wout	(Kazakhstan) Denis Nikisha	(Italy) Pietro Sighel	
6 November 2022	Utah Olympic Oval	1000m	(South Korea) Park Ji-won	(South Korea) Hong Kyung-hwan	(Kazakhstan) Adil Galiakhmetov	
5 November 2022	Utah Olympic Oval	1500m	(Netherlands) Jens van 't Wout	(South Korea) Park Ji-won	(Latvia) Reinis Bērziņš	
6 November 2022	Utah Olympic Oval	5000m relay	Canada	South Korea	China	

==== Almaty 9-11 December 2022 ====
Date	Place	Distance	Winner	Second	Third	Reference
11 December 2022	Halyk Arena	500m	(South Korea) Kim Tae-sung	(Kazakhstan) Denis Nikisha	(South Korea) Jang Sun-woo	
10 December 2022	Halyk Arena	1000m	(Netherlands) Jens van 't Wout	(Canada) Pascal Dion	(Canada) Jordan Pierre-Gilles	
10 December 2022	Halyk Arena	1500m (1)	(South Korea) Hong Kyung-hwan	(Belgium) Stijn Desmet	(South Korea) Kim Tae-sung	
11 December 2022	Halyk Arena	1500m (2)	(South Korea) Park Ji-won	(South Korea) Hong Kyung-hwan	(Canada) Pascal Dion	
11 December 2022	Halyk Arena	5000m relay	Canada	South Korea	Japan	

==== Almaty 16-18 December 2022 ====
Date	Place	Distance	Winner	Second	Third	Reference
17 December 2022	Halyk Arena	500m (1)	(Poland) Diane Sellier	(Canada) Steven Dubois	(Kazakhstan) Denis Nikisha	
18 December 2022	Halyk Arena	500m (2)	(Kazakhstan) Denis Nikisha	(South Korea) Jang Sung-woo	(Belgium) Stijn Desmet	
18 December 2022	Halyk Arena	1000m	(South Korea) Park Ji-won	(Canada) Steven Dubois	(Latvia) Roberts Krūzbergs	
17 December 2022	Halyk Arena	1500m	(South Korea) Park Ji-won	(Belgium) Stijn Desmet	(South Korea) Hong Kyung-hwan	
18 December 2022	Halyk Arena	5000m relay	Canada	Netherlands	Japan	

==== Dresden 3-5 February 2023 ====
Date	Place	Distance	Winner	Second	Third	Reference
5 February 2023	Joynext Arena	500m	(China) Lin Xiaojun	(China) Zhong Yuchen	(Japan) Kazuki Yoshinaga	
4 February 2023	Joynext Arena	1000m	(South Korea) Park Ji-won	(Latvia) Roberts Krūzbergs	(Canada) Félix Roussel	
4 February 2023	Joynext Arena	1500m (1)	(South Korea) Lee June-seo	(Italy) Pietro Sighel	(South Korea) Lim Yong-jin	
5 February 2023	Joynext Arena	1500m (2)	(South Korea) Park Ji-won	(Netherlands) Sjinkie Knegt	(Latvia) Reinis Bērziņš	
5 February 2023	Joynext Arena	5000m relay	China	Japan	Hungary	

==== Dordrecht 10-12 February 2023 ====
Date	Place	Distance	Winner	Second	Third	Reference
12 February 2023	Optisport Sportboulevard Dordrecht	500m	(China) Lin Xiaojun	(South Korea) Lim Yong-jin	(Poland) Lukasz Kuczynski	
11 February 2023	Optisport Sportboulevard Dordrecht	1000m (1)	(Canada) Steven Dubois	(Canada) Pascal Dion	(Latvia) Roberts Krūzbergs	
12 February 2023	Optisport Sportboulevard Dordrecht	1000m (2)	(South Korea) Park Ji-won	(Canada) Pascal Dion	(Italy) Luca Spechenhauser	
11 February 2023	Optisport Sportboulevard Dordrecht	1500m	(South Korea) Park Ji-won	(South Korea) Lee Donghyun	(Netherlands) Jens van 't Wout	
12 February 2023	Optisport Sportboulevard Dordrecht	5000m relay	South Korea	China	Japan	

=== Women ===
==== Montreal 28-30 October 2022 ====
Date	Place	Distance	Winner	Second	Third	Reference
30 October 2022	Maurice Richard Arena	500m	(Netherlands) Xandra Velzeboer	(Poland) Natalia Maliszewska	(South Korea) Shim Suk-hee	
30 October 2022	Maurice Richard Arena	1000m (1)	(Netherlands) Xandra Velzeboer	(South Korea) Shim Suk-hee	(South Korea) Seo Whi-min	
30 October 2022	Maurice Richard Arena	1000m (2)	(Netherlands) Suzanne Schulting	(South Korea) Choi Min-jeong	(South Korea) Kim Gil-li	
30 October 2022	Maurice Richard Arena	1500m	(Netherlands) Suzanne Schulting	(South Korea) Kim Gil-li	(United States) Kristen Santos	
30 October 2022	Maurice Richard Arena	3000m relay	Netherlands	Canada	Italy	

==== Salt Lake City 4-6 November 2022 ====
Date	Place	Distance	Winner	Second	Third	Reference
5 November 2022	Utah Olympic Oval	500m (1)	(Canada) Kim Boutin	(Poland) Natalia Maliszewska	(United States) Kristen Santos	
6 November 2022	Utah Olympic Oval	500m (2)	(Netherlands) Xandra Velzeboer	(South Korea) Choi Min-jeong	(Canada) Rikki Doak	
6 November 2022	Utah Olympic Oval	1000m	(Netherlands) Suzanne Schulting	(Canada) Courtney Sarault	(United States) Kristen Santos	
5 November 2022	Utah Olympic Oval	1500m	(South Korea) Kim Gil-li	(Germany) Anna Seidel	(South Korea) Choi Min-jeong	
6 November 2022	Utah Olympic Oval	3000m relay	South Korea	Canada	Italy	

==== Almaty 9-11 December 2022 ====
Date	Place	Distance	Winner	Second	Third	Reference
11 December 2022	Halyk Arena	500m	(Canada) Kim Boutin	(Netherlands) Suzanne Schulting	(United States) Kristen Santos	
10 December 2022	Halyk Arena	1000m	(Canada) Courtney Sarault	(South Korea) Shim Suk-hee	(United States) Corinne Stoddard	
10 December 2022	Halyk Arena	1500m (1)	(Netherlands) Suzanne Schulting	(South Korea) Choi Min-jeong	(South Korea) Kim Gil-li	
11 December 2022	Halyk Arena	1500m (2)	(Belgium) Hanne Desmet	(Canada) Courtney Sarault	(Germany) Anna Seidel	
11 December 2022	Halyk Arena	3000m relay	Canada	Netherlands	South Korea	

==== Almaty 16-18 December 2022 ====
Date	Place	Distance	Winner	Second	Third	Reference
17 December 2022	Halyk Arena	500m (1)	(Netherlands) Suzanne Schulting	(Poland) Natalia Maliszewska	(Netherlands) Yara van Kerkhof	
18 December 2022	Halyk Arena	500m (2)	(Netherlands) Yara van Kerkhof	(Netherlands) Michelle Velzeboer	(Hungary) Petra Jászapáti	
18 December 2022	Halyk Arena	1000m	(Netherlands) Suzanne Schulting	(United States) Kristen Santos	(Belgium) Hanne Desmet	
17 December 2022	Halyk Arena	1500m	(Canada) Courtney Sarault	(Belgium) Hanne Desmet	(South Korea) Shim Suk-hee	
18 December 2022	Halyk Arena	3000m relay	South Korea	Canada	Hungary	

==== Dresden 3-5 February 2023 ====
Date	Place	Distance	Winner	Second	Third	Reference
5 February 2023	Joynext Arena	500m	(Netherlands) Suzanne Schulting	(Netherlands) Xandra Velzeboer	(South Korea) Choi Min-jeong	
4 February 2023	Joynext Arena	1000m	(Netherlands) Suzanne Schulting	(Belgium) Hanne Desmet	(China) Zhang Chutong	
4 February 2023	Joynext Arena	1500m (1)	(South Korea) Choi Min-jeong	(United States) Kristen Santos	(Canada) Courtney Sarault	
5 February 2023	Joynext Arena	1500m (2)	(South Korea) Kim Gil-li	(Germany) Anna Seidel	(South Korea) Shim Suk-hee	
5 February 2023	Joynext Arena	3000m relay	Netherlands	Canada	South Korea	

==== Dordrecht 10-12 February 2023 ====
Date	Place	Distance	Winner	Second	Third	Reference
12 February 2023	Optisport Sportboulevard Dordrecht	500m	(Netherlands) Xandra Velzeboer	(Canada) Kim Boutin	(Canada) Rikki Doak	
11 February 2023	Optisport Sportboulevard Dordrecht	1000m (1)	(Canada) Kim Boutin	(United States) Kristen Santos	(Netherlands) Xandra Velzeboer	
12 February 2023	Optisport Sportboulevard Dordrecht	1000m (2)	(Canada) Courtney Sarault	(South Korea) Kim Gil-li	(Netherlands) Suzanne Schulting	
11 February 2023	Optisport Sportboulevard Dordrecht	1500m	(Belgium) Hanne Desmet	(Netherlands) Suzanne Schulting	(South Korea) Shim Suk-hee	
12 February 2023	Optisport Sportboulevard Dordrecht	3000m relay	Canada	Hungary	China	

=== Mixed ===
==== Montreal 28-30 October 2022 ====
Date	Place	Distance	Winner	Second	Third	Reference
30 October 2022	Maurice Richard Arena	2000m relay	South Korea	Belgium	Canada	

==== Salt Lake City 4-6 November 2022 ====
Date	Place	Distance	Winner	Second	Third	Reference
5 November 2022	Utah Olympic Oval	2000m relay	China	South Korea	United States	

==== Almaty 9-11 December 2022 ====
Date	Place	Distance	Winner	Second	Third	Reference
10 December 2022	Halyk Arena	2000m relay	South Korea	China	Belgium	

==== Almaty 16-18 December 2022 ====
Date	Place	Distance	Winner	Second	Third	Reference
17 December 2022	Halyk Arena	2000m relay	South Korea	Belgium	Poland	

==== Dresden 3-5 February 2023 ====
Date	Place	Distance	Winner	Second	Third	Reference
4 February 2023	Joynext Arena	2000m relay	Italy	South Korea	Netherlands	

==== Dordrecht 10-12 February 2023 ====
Date	Place	Distance	Winner	Second	Third	Reference
11 February 2023	Optisport Sportboulevard Dordrecht	2000m relay	Netherlands	Canada	Poland	

== World Cup standings ==
=== Men's 500 metres ===
Standings after 8 of 8 events

Pos	Athlete	Points
1.	Denis Nikisha (KAZ)	402
2.	Steven Dubois (CAN)	348
3.	Diane Sellier (POL)	326
4.	Pietro Sighel (ITA)	304
5.	Lim Yong-jin (KOR)	262

=== Women's 500 metres ===
Standings after 8 of 8 events

Pos	Athlete	Points
1.	Xandra Velzeboer (NED)	426
2.	Natalia Maliszewska (POL)	368
3.	Kim Boutin (CAN)	336
4.	Rikki Doak (CAN)	324
5.	Yara van Kerkhof (NED)	312

=== Men's 1000 metres ===
Standings after 8 of 8 events

Pos	Athlete	Points
1.	Park Ji-won (KOR)	488
2.	Pascal Dion (CAN)	450
3.	Roberts Krūzbergs (LAT)	402
4.	Hong Kyung-hwan (KOR)	244
5.	Kim Tae-Sung (KOR)	234

=== Women's 1000 metres ===
Standings after 8 of 8 events

Pos	Athlete	Points
1.	Suzanne Schulting (NED)	470
2.	Courtney Sarault (CAN)	360
3.	Hanne Desmet (BEL)	324
4.	Kim Boutin (CAN)	284
5.	Corinne Stoddard (USA)	266

=== Men's 1500 metres ===
Standings after 8 of 8 events

Pos	Athlete	Points
1.	Park Ji-won (KOR)	580
2.	Hong Kyung-hwan (KOR)	430
3.	Friso Emons (NED)	320
4.	Reinis Bērziņš (LAT)	258
5.	Stijn Desmet (BEL)	252

=== Women's 1500 metres ===
Standings after 8 of 8 events

Pos	Athlete	Points
1.	Kim Gil-li (KOR)	450
2.	Hanne Desmet (BEL)	420
3.	Courtney Sarault (CAN)	392
4.	Kristen Santos (USA)	314
5.	Choi Min-jeong (KOR)	310

=== Men's 5000 metre relay ===
Standings after 6 of 6 events

Pos	Athlete	Points
1	Canada	370
2	South Korea	360
3	China	300
4	Japan	290
5	Kazakhstan	250

=== Women's 3000 metre relay ===
Standings after 6 of 6 events

Pos	Athlete	Points
1	Canada	360
2	Netherlands	340
3	South Korea	340
4	Italy	244
5	Hungary	240

=== Mixed 2000 metre relay ===
Standings after 6 of 6 events

Pos	Country	Points
1	South Korea	380
2	Netherlands	290
3	Belgium	280
4	Canada	260
5	China	256

== Crystal Globe Awardees ==
The Crystal Globes were awarded for the first time in the 2022-23 season. The winners were:

- Men: (South Korea) Park Ji-won
- Women: (Netherlands) Suzanne Schulting

== Medal count ==
Rank	Nation	Gold	Silver	Bronze	Total
1	South Korea	22	20	18	60
2	Netherlands	19	7	6	32
3	Canada	15	14	8	37
4	China	4	3	3	10
5	Belgium	2	6	2	10
6	Kazakhstan	1	4	2	7
7	Poland	1	3	3	7
8	Italy	1	1	5	7
9	Latvia	1	1	4	6
10	United States	0	3	6	9
11	Germany	0	2	2	4
12	Japan	0	1	4	5
13	Hungary	0	1	3	4
Totals (13 entries)		66	66	66	198

== See also ==
- 2023 Four Continents Short Track Speed Skating Championships
- 2023 European Short Track Speed Skating Championships
- 2023 World Short Track Speed Skating Championships
