= Short-track speed skating at the 2025 Asian Winter Games – Men's 1000 metres =

Men's 1000 metres at the 2025 Asian Winter Games
- Venue: Heilongjiang Multifunctional Hall
- Dates: 7–9 February 2025
- Competitors: 37 from 17 nations

Medalists
gold medal	Jang Sung-woo	South Korea
silver medal	Park Ji-won	South Korea
bronze medal	Liu Shaoang	China

The men's 1000 metres competition in short-track speed skating at the 2025 Asian Winter Games was held on 7 and 9 February 2025 in Harbin, China.

== Schedule ==
All times are China Standard Time (UTC+08:00)

Date	Time	Event
Friday, 7 February 2025	11:24	Heats
Sunday, 9 February 2025	10:16	Quarterfinals
Sunday, 9 February 2025	10:56	Semifinals
Sunday, 9 February 2025	11:30	Finals

== Results ==
Legend

- ADV — Advanced
- DNS — Did not start
- PEN — Penalty

=== Heats ===
- Qualification: 1–2 + Four best 3 → Quarterfinals (Q + q)

==== Heat 1 ====
Rank	Athlete	Time	Notes
1	Park Ji-won (KOR)	1:25.419	Q
2	Kota Kikuchi (JPN)	1:29.629	Q
3	Ong Ryo Yik (SGP)	1:33.486	
4	Arsa Mizan Putra Firdaus (INA)	1:37.456	
5	Ameer Iman Fadzli (MAS)	1:46.735	

==== Heat 2 ====
Rank	Athlete	Time	Notes
1	Jang Sung-woo (KOR)	1:26.699	Q
2	Shuta Matsuzu (JPN)	1:26.845	Q
3	Kwok Tsz Fung (HKG)	1:28.840	q
4	Marva Kayana Putra Firdaus (INA)	1:32.880	
5	Akash Aradhya (IND)	1:45.335	

==== Heat 3 ====
Rank	Athlete	Time	Notes
1	Liu Shaoang (CHN)	1:30.539	Q
2	Chang Chuan-lin (TPE)	1:30.821	Q
3	Chonlachart Taprom (THA)	1:30.935	q
4	Kwok Tsz Ho (HKG)	1:34.858	
5	Erdenebilegiin Mönkh-Erdene (MGL)	1:50.694	

==== Heat 4 ====
Rank	Athlete	Time	Notes
1	Sun Long (CHN)	1:34.753	Q
2	Daito Ochi (JPN)	1:34.998	Q
3	Phooripat Changmai (THA)	1:36.040	
4	Sohan Sudhir Tarkar (IND)	1:40.344	
5	Mönkhbayaryn Borkhüü (MGL)	1:41.762	

==== Heat 5 ====
Rank	Athlete	Time	Notes
1	Lin Xiaojun (CHN)	1:30.879	Q
2	Aibek Nassen (KAZ)	1:32.155	Q
3	Prajwal Sharath (IND)	1:35.991	
4	Pena Ataýew (TKM)	1:54.772	

==== Heat 6 ====
Rank	Athlete	Time	Notes
1	Kim Gun-woo (KOR)	1:29.187	Q
2	Daniil Eybog (UZB)	1:29.268	Q
3	Lin Chun-chieh (TPE)	1:30.950	
4	Mohammed Al-Abdulla (QAT)	2:00.512	
5	Dương Trường Lập (VIE)	2:02.714	

==== Heat 7 ====
Rank	Athlete	Time	Notes
1	Gleb Ivchenko (KAZ)	1:40.338	Q
2	Sidney Chu (HKG)	1:41.993	Q
3	Prakit Borvornmongkolsak (THA)	1:42.414	ADV
—	Brandon Pok (SGP)	PEN	

==== Heat 8 ====
Rank	Athlete	Time	Notes
1	Adil Galiakhmetov (KAZ)	1:29.468	Q
2	Peter Groseclose (PHI)	1:29.636	Q
3	Tsai Chia-wei (TPE)	1:30.600	q
4	Garmaagiin Mönkh-Erdene (MGL)	1:34.339	

=== Quarterfinals ===
- Qualification: 1–2 + Two best 3 → Quarterfinals (Q + q)

==== Heat 1 ====
Rank	Athlete	Time	Notes
1	Shuta Matsuzu (JPN)	1:26.540	Q
2	Park Ji-won (KOR)	1:26.657	Q
3	Gleb Ivchenko (KAZ)	1:26.828	q
4	Kwok Tsz Fung (HKG)	1:28.030	q
5	Sidney Chu (HKG)	1:28.973	

- Gleb Ivchenko of Kazakhstan was initially disqualified but later reinstated.

==== Heat 2 ====
Rank	Athlete	Time	Notes
1	Sun Long (CHN)	1:27.099	Q
2	Jang Sung-woo (KOR)	1:27.208	Q
3	Daito Ochi (JPN)	1:27.475	q
4	Daniil Eybog (UZB)	1:27.705	
5	Tsai Chia-wei (TPE)	1:29.972	

==== Heat 3 ====
Rank	Athlete	Time	Notes
1	Kim Gun-woo (KOR)	1:28.269	Q
2	Lin Xiaojun (CHN)	1:28.347	Q
3	Aibek Nassen (KAZ)	1:29.064	
4	Kota Kikuchi (JPN)	1:29.621	
5	Chonlachart Taprom (THA)	1:30.943	

==== Heat 4 ====
Rank	Athlete	Time	Notes
1	Adil Galiakhmetov (KAZ)	1:27.443	Q
2	Liu Shaoang (CHN)	1:27.720	Q
3	Peter Groseclose (PHI)	1:28.045	
4	Chang Chuan-lin (TPE)	1:28.106	
5	Prakit Borvornmongkolsak (THA)	1:30.124	

=== Semifinals ===
- Qualification: 1–2 + Best 3 → Final A (QA), Next best five → Final B (QB)

==== Heat 1 ====
Rank	Athlete	Time	Notes
1	Sun Long (CHN)	1:26.056	QA
2	Park Ji-won (KOR)	1:26.625	QA
3	Gleb Ivchenko (KAZ)	1:26.794	QB
4	Shuta Matsuzu (JPN)	1:26.889	ADVA
—	Lin Xiaojun (CHN)	PEN	

==== Heat 2 ====
Rank	Athlete	Time	Notes
1	Liu Shaoang (CHN)	1:25.996	QA
2	Jang Sung-woo (KOR)	1:26.116	QA
3	Adil Galiakhmetov (KAZ)	1:26.234	QB
4	Daito Ochi (JPN)	1:26.398	QB
5	Kim Gun-woo (KOR)	1:26.753	QB
6	Kwok Tsz Fung (HKG)	1:28.014	QB

=== Finals ===
==== Final B ====
Rank	Athlete	Time
1	Gleb Ivchenko (KAZ)	1:33.378
2	Daito Ochi (JPN)	1:33.681
3	Kwok Tsz Fung (HKG)	1:34.790
4	Adil Galiakhmetov (KAZ)	1:45.870
—	Kim Gun-woo (KOR)	DNS

==== Final A ====
Rank	Athlete	Time
1st place, gold medalist(s)	Jang Sung-woo (KOR)	1:28.304
2nd place, silver medalist(s)	Park Ji-won (KOR)	1:28.829
3rd place, bronze medalist(s)	Liu Shaoang (CHN)	1:28.905
4	Shuta Matsuzu (JPN)	1:29.959
5	Sun Long (CHN)	1:44.169
