= Short-track speed skating at the 2025 Asian Winter Games – Men's 5000 metre relay =

Men's 5000 metre relay at the 2025 Asian Winter Games
- Venue: Heilongjiang Multifunctional Hall
- Dates: 9 February 2025
- Competitors: 41 from 8 nations

Medalists
gold medal	Kazakhstan; Gleb Ivchenko, Denis Nikisha, Mersaid Zhaxybayev, Adil Galiakhmetov, Aibek Nassen, Abzal Azhgaliyev
silver medal	Japan; Shun Saito, Daito Ochi, Shuta Matsuzu, Tsubasa Furukawa, Osuke Irie, Kota Kikuchi
bronze medal	China; Liu Shaoang, Lin Xiaojun, Sun Long, Liu Shaolin, Zhu Yiding, Li Wenlong

The men's 5000 metre relay competition in short-track speed skating at the 2025 Asian Winter Games was held on 9 February 2025 in Harbin, China.

== Schedule ==
All times are China Standard Time (UTC+08:00)

Date	Time	Event
Sunday, 9 February 2025	12:11	Semifinals
Sunday, 9 February 2025	12:55	Finals

== Results ==
=== Semifinals ===
- Qualification: 1–2 → Final A (QA), 3–4 → Final B (QB)

==== Heat 1 ====
Rank	Team	Time	Notes
1	China (CHN); Zhu Yiding; Lin Xiaojun; Li Wenlong; Liu Shaolin	7:10.291	QA
2	Japan (JPN); Shun Saito; Osuke Irie; Daito Ochi; Kota Kikuchi	7:14.926	QA
3	Chinese Taipei (TPE); Tsai Chia-wei; Lin Chun-chieh; Lai Tsai Huan-chen; Chang Chuan-lin	7:31.168	QB
—	Thailand (THA); Chonlachart Taprom; Phooripat Changmai; Prakit Borvornmongkolsak; Chirawat Phonkat	PEN	

==== Heat 2 ====
Rank	Team	Time	Notes
1	South Korea (KOR); Park Ji-won; Park Jang-hyuk; Kim Gun-woo; Lee Jung-su	6:53.912	QA
2	Kazakhstan (KAZ); Aibek Nassen; Denis Nikisha; Mersaid Zhaxybayev; Abzal Azhgaliyev	6:55.242	QA
3	Hong Kong (HKG); Marvin Chen; Kwok Tsz Fung; Sidney Chu; Kwok Tsz Ho	7:39.413	QB
4	India (IND); Suyog Sanjay Tapkir; Prajwal Sharath; Akash Aradhya; Eklavya Jagal	7:45.117	QB

=== Finals ===
==== Final B ====
Rank	Team	Time
1	Chinese Taipei (TPE); Tsai Chia-wei; Lin Chun-chieh; Lai Tsai Huan-chen; Chang Chuan-lin	7:15.589
2	Hong Kong (HKG); Marvin Chen; Kwok Tsz Fung; Sidney Chu; Kwok Tsz Ho	7:29.073
3	India (IND); Suyog Sanjay Tapkir; Prajwal Sharath; Eklavya Jagal; Sohan Sudhir Tarkar	7:56.944

==== Final A ====
Rank	Team	Time
1st place, gold medalist(s)	Kazakhstan (KAZ); Gleb Ivchenko; Denis Nikisha; Mersaid Zhaxybayev; Adil Galiakhmetov	6:59.415
2nd place, silver medalist(s)	Japan (JPN); Shun Saito; Daito Ochi; Shuta Matsuzu; Tsubasa Furukawa	7:03.010
3rd place, bronze medalist(s)	China (CHN); Liu Shaoang; Lin Xiaojun; Sun Long; Liu Shaolin	7:03.909
—	South Korea (KOR); Park Ji-won; Jang Sung-woo; Kim Tae-sung; Park Jang-hyuk	PEN
