= 2017–18 ISU Short Track Speed Skating World Cup =

International speed skating competition

- Dates: 28 September 2017 – 19 November 2017

The 2017–18 ISU Short Track Speed Skating World Cup was a multi-race tournament over a season for short track speed skating. The season began on 28 September 2017 in Hungary and ended on 19 November 2017. The World Cup was organised by the ISU who also ran world cups and championships in speed skating and figure skating.

The World Cup consisted of just four competitions this year (rather than six) due to the 2018 Winter Olympics in Pyeongchang.

== Calendar ==
=== Men ===
==== Budapest 28 September–1 October 2017 ====
Date	Place	Distance	Winner	Second	Third	Reference
30 September 2017	SYMA Sports and Conference Centre	500m	(Hungary) Sándor Liu Shaolin	(South Korea) Lim Hyo-jun	(South Korea) Hwang Dae-heon	
1 October 2017	SYMA Sports and Conference Centre	1000m	(South Korea) Lim Hyo-jun	(South Korea) Hwang Dae-heon	(China) Han Tianyu	
30 September 2017	SYMA Sports and Conference Centre	1500m	(South Korea) Lim Hyo-jun	(South Korea) Hwang Dae-heon	(Netherlands) Sjinkie Knegt	
1 October 2017	SYMA Sports and Conference Centre	5000m relay	Canada	China	Japan	

==== Dordrecht 5–8 October 2017 ====
Date	Place	Distance	Winner	Second	Third	Reference
7 October 2017	Sportboulevard Dordrecht	500m	(Canada) Samuel Girard	(Netherlands) Sjinkie Knegt	(South Korea) Hwang Dae-heon	
8 October 2017	Sportboulevard Dordrecht	1000m	(Netherlands) Sjinkie Knegt	(Canada) Samuel Girard	(South Korea) Seo Yi-ra	
7 October 2017	Sportboulevard Dordrecht	1500m	(South Korea) Hwang Dae-heon	(Hungary) Shaoang Liu	(Canada) Charles Hamelin	
8 October 2017	Sportboulevard Dordrecht	5000m relay	Canada	Netherlands	China	

==== Shanghai 9–12 November 2017 ====
Date	Place	Distance	Winner	Second	Third	Reference
11 November 2017	Oriental Sports Center	500m	(China) Wu Dajing	(South Korea) Seo Yi-ra	(South Korea) Kim Do-kyoum	
12 November 2017	Oriental Sports Center	1000m	(China) Wu Dajing	(Hungary) Sándor Liu Shaolin	(Hungary) Liu Shaoang	
11 November 2017	Oriental Sports Center	1500m	(South Korea) Hwang Dae-heon	(Netherlands) Sjinkie Knegt	(South Korea) Kim Do-kyoum	
12 November 2017	Oriental Sports Center	5000m relay	United States	South Korea	Canada	

==== Seoul 16–19 November 2017 ====
Date	Place	Distance	Winner	Second	Third	Reference
18 November 2017	Mokdong Ice Rink	500m	(China) Wu Dajing	(Hungary) Sándor Liu Shaolin	(Hungary) Liu Shaoang	
19 November 2017	Mokdong Ice Rink	1000m	(Hungary) Sándor Liu Shaolin	(South Korea) Hwang Dae-heon	(Canada) Samuel Girard	
18 November 2017	Mokdong Ice Rink	1500m	(Canada) Charles Hamelin	(South Korea) Hwang Dae-heon	(United States) J. R. Celski	
19 November 2017	Mokdong Ice Rink	5000m relay	South Korea	Netherlands	United States	

=== Women ===
==== Budapest 28 September–1 October 2017 ====
Date	Place	Distance	Winner	Second	Third	Reference
30 September 2017	SYMA Sports and Conference Centre	500m	(South Korea) Choi Min-jeong	(Italy) Arianna Fontana	(South Korea) Shim Suk-hee	
1 October 2017	SYMA Sports and Conference Centre	1000m	(South Korea) Choi Min-jeong	(Canada) Kim Boutin	(United Kingdom) Elise Christie	
30 September 2017	SYMA Sports and Conference Centre	1500m	(South Korea) Choi Min-jeong	(Canada) Kim Boutin	(Australia) Deanna Lockett	
1 October 2017	SYMA Sports and Conference Centre	3000m relay	South Korea	Canada	Russia	

==== Dordrecht 5–8 October 2017 ====
Date	Place	Distance	Winner	Second	Third	Reference
7 October 2017	Sportboulevard Dordrecht	500m	(Canada) Marianne St-Gelais	(Canada) Kim Boutin	(Italy) Martina Valcepina	
8 October 2017	Sportboulevard Dordrecht	1000m	(South Korea) Shim Suk-hee	(Netherlands) Suzanne Schulting	(South Korea) Lee Yu-bin	
7 October 2017	Sportboulevard Dordrecht	1500m	(South Korea) Choi Min-jeong	(Canada) Valérie Maltais	(South Korea) Shim Suk-hee	
8 October 2017	Sportboulevard Dordrecht	3000m relay	China	South Korea	Canada	

==== Shanghai 9–12 November 2017 ====
Date	Place	Distance	Winner	Second	Third	Reference
11 November 2017	Oriental Sports Center	500m	(Canada) Kim Boutin	(Italy) Arianna Fontana	(Russia) Sofia Prosvirnova	
12 November 2017	Oriental Sports Center	1000m	(Canada) Kim Boutin	(Canada) Marianne St-Gelais	(Italy) Arianna Fontana	
11 November 2017	Oriental Sports Center	1500m	(South Korea) Shim Suk-hee	(South Korea) Choi Min-jeong	(Canada) Marianne St-Gelais	
12 November 2017	Oriental Sports Center	3000m relay	South Korea	China	Italy	

==== Seoul 16–19 November 2017 ====
Date	Place	Distance	Winner	Second	Third	Reference
18 November 2017	Mokdong Ice Rink	500m	(United Kingdom) Elise Christie	(South Korea) Choi Min-jeong	(Italy) Martina Valcepina	
19 November 2017	Mokdong Ice Rink	1000m	(South Korea) Choi Min-jeong	(Canada) Kim Boutin	(Netherlands) Yara Van Kerkhof	
18 November 2017	Mokdong Ice Rink	1500m	(South Korea) Choi Min-jeong	(South Korea) Shim Suk-hee	(Canada) Kim Boutin	
19 November 2017	Mokdong Ice Rink	3000m relay	Netherlands	Russia	South Korea	

== World Cup standings ==
=== Men's 500 metres ===
Standings after 4 events

Pos	Athlete	Points
1.	Wu Dajing (CHN)	25120
2.	Sándor Liu Shaolin (HUN)	22096
3.	Samuel Girard (CAN)	16717
4.	Hwang Dae-heon (KOR)	14897
5.	Shaoang Liu (HUN)	11700

=== Women's 500 metres ===
Standings after 4 events

Pos	Athlete	Points
1.	Marianne St-Gelais (CAN)	20240
2.	Choi Min-jeong (KOR)	20097
3.	Arianna Fontana (ITA)	18621
4.	Kim Boutin (CAN)	18000
5.	Martina Valcepina (ITA)	17920

=== Men's 1000 metres ===
Standings after 4 events

Pos	Athlete	Points
1.	Sándor Liu Shaolin (HUN)	19342
2.	Wu Dajing (CHN)	18621
3.	Hwang Dae-heon (KOR)	18397
4.	Sjinkie Knegt (NED)	15438
5.	Samuel Girard (CAN)	14681

=== Women's 1000 metres ===
Standings after 4 events

Pos	Athlete	Points
1.	Kim Boutin (CAN)	26000
2.	Choi Min-jeong (KOR)	20000
3.	Shim Suk-hee (KOR)	16462
4.	Suzanne Schulting (NED)	14193
5.	Yara Van Kerkhof (NED)	14141

=== Men's 1500 metres ===
Standings after 4 events

Pos	Athlete	Points
1.	Hwang Dae-heon (KOR)	28000
2.	Sjinkie Knegt (NED)	18496
3.	Charles Hamelin (CAN)	16580
4.	Lim Hyo Jun (KOR)	12621
5.	Shaoang Liu (HUN)	11674

=== Women's 1500 metres ===
Standings after 4 events

Pos	Athlete	Points
1.	Choi Min-jeong (KOR)	30000
2.	Shim Suk-hee (KOR)	24400
3.	Kim Boutin (CAN)	18496
4.	Valérie Maltais (CAN)	17216
5.	Marianne St-Gelais (CAN)	11520

=== Men's 5000 metre relay ===
Standings after 4 events

Pos	Athlete	Points
1	Canada	26400
2	South Korea	23120
3	United States	19677
4	China	19520
5	Netherlands	17678

=== Women's 3000 metre relay ===
Standings after 4 events

Pos	Athlete	Points
1	South Korea	28000
2	China	23120
3	Canada	18763
4	Russia	18496
5	Netherlands	17741

== See also ==
- 2018 World Short Track Speed Skating Championships
