= Uzbekistan at the 2025 Asian Winter Games =

- Flag of Uzbekistan
- IOC code: UZB
- NOC: National Olympic Committee of the Republic of Uzbekistan

in Harbin, China 7 February 2025 – 14 February 2025
- Competitors: 23 in 6 sports
- Flag bearer: Jasur Shamsiddinov & Feruza Bobokulova
- Medals Ranked =5th: Gold 1 Silver 0 Bronze 0 Total 1

Asian Winter Games appearances
- 1996; 1999; 2003; 2007; 2011; 2017; 2025; 2029

Uzbekistan competed at the 2025 Asian Winter Games in Harbin, China, from February 7 to 14. The Uzbekistani team consisted of 23 athletes competing in six sports. Ski mountaineers Jasur Shamsiddinov and Feruza Bobokulova were the country's flagbearers during the opening ceremony.

Uzbekistan won its first gold medal in 26 years, and second overall, in the pairs figure skating event.

== Medalists ==
Medal	Name	Sport	Event	Date
Gold	Dmitrii Chigirev; Ekaterina Geynish	Figure skating	Pairs	12 February

== Competitors ==
The following table lists the Uzbekistani delegation per sport and gender.

Sport	Men	Women	Total
Alpine skiing	3	4	7
Biathlon	2	0	2
Figure skating	1	3	4
Short-track speed skating	1	0	1
Ski mountaineering	4	4	8
Speed skating	1	0	1
Total	12	11	23

== Alpine skiing ==
Uzbekistan entered seven alpine skiers (four per gender).

Men

Athlete	Event	Run 1		Run 2		Total	
Athlete	Event	Time	Rank	Time	Rank	Time	Rank
Arman Gayupov	Slalom	46.64	8	47.94	9	1:34.58	6
Nikita Gorkovskiy	Slalom	50.66	17	49.72	14	1:40.38	14
Medet Nazarov	Slalom	Did not finish					

Women

Athlete	Event	Run 1		Run 2		Total	
Athlete	Event	Time	Rank	Time	Rank	Time	Rank
Kseniya Grigoreva	Slalom	56.92	18	Disqualified			
Valeriya Kovaleva	Slalom	59.86	22	56.55	17	1:56.41	17
Mariya Morozova	Slalom	1:07.49	27	1:05.67	23	2:13.16	23
Sabrina Rejepova	Slalom	57.28	19	55.87	15	1:53.15	15

== Biathlon ==
Uzbekistan entered two biathletes.

Men

Athlete	Event	Time	Misses	Rank
Dilmurod Abdurakhmonov	Sprint	51:15.4	2+1	31
Rolan Raimkulov	Sprint	40:22.2	3+3	25

== Figure skating ==
Uzbekistan entered four figure skaters (one man and three women). Dmitrii Chigirev and Ekaterina Geynish won Uzbekistan's only medal at the games, a gold in the pairs event.

Athlete(s)	Event	SP		FP		Total	
Athlete(s)	Event	Points	Rank	Points	Rank	Points	Rank
Niginabonu Jamoliddinova	Women's	27.88	18 Q	67.81	15	95.69	17
Sevinch Rakhimova	Women's	18.09	24 Q	51.63	21	69.72	22
Dmitrii Chigirev; Ekaterina Geynish	Pairs	64.55	1	111.88	2	176.43	1st place, gold medalist(s)

== Short-track speed skating ==
Uzbekistan entered one male short-track speed skater.

Men

Athlete	Event	Heat		Quarterfinal		Semifinal		Final	
Athlete	Event	Time	Rank	Time	Rank	Time	Rank	Time	Rank
Daniil Eybog	500 m	41.143	2 Q	41.350	3 q	41.431	3 FB	42.457	7
Daniil Eybog	1000 m	1:29.268	2 Q	1:27.705	4	Did not advance			14
Daniil Eybog	1500 m	—		2:30.611	3 Q	3:06.877	7	Did not advance	20

== Ski mountaineering ==
Uzbekistan entered eight ski mountaineers (four per gender).

Men

Athlete	Event	Qualification		Semifinals		Final	
Athlete	Event	Time	Rank	Time	Rank	Time	Rank
Makhsudjon Akabirov	Sprint	4:06.92	20	Did not advance			
Izozbek Khushvaktov	Sprint	3:59.46	18	Did not advance			
Shohruh Sardorov	Sprint	DSQ		Did not advance			
Jasur Shamsiddinov	Sprint	3:52.71	16	Did not advance			

Women

Athlete	Event	Qualification		Semifinals		Final	
Athlete	Event	Time	Rank	Time	Rank	Time	Rank
Mokhinur Aralova	Sprint	Did not start		Did not advance			
Feruza Bobokulova	Sprint	Did not start		Did not advance			
Asila Shayimova	Sprint	Did not start		Did not advance			
Ezoza Shaymardonova	Sprint	Did not start		Did not advance			

Mixed

Athlete	Event	Qualification		Final	
Athlete	Event	Time	Rank	Time	Rank
Jasur Shamsiddinov; Asila Shayimova	Relay	21:51.63	12 Q	LAP	12

== Speed skating ==
Uzbekistan entered one male speed skater. Danila Semerikov formerly represented Russia, but switched to compete for Uzbekistan.

Men

Athlete	Event	Time	Rank
Danila Semerikov	5000 m	6:39.71	6
