= Vietnam at the 2025 Asian Winter Games =

- Flag of Vietnam
- IOC code: VIE
- NOC: Vietnam Olympic Committee

in Harbin, China 7 February 2025 – 14 February 2025
- Competitors: 1 in 1 sport
- Flag bearer: Dương Trường Lập
- Medals: Gold 0 Silver 0 Bronze 0 Total 0

Asian Winter Games appearances
- 2017; 2025; 2029

Vietnam competed at the 2025 Asian Winter Games in Harbin, China, from February 7 to 14. The Vietnamese delegation consisted of one male short-track speed skater. The entire delegation consisted of three people, one athlete along with his coach and chef de mission. As the only athlete Dương Trường Lập was the country's opening ceremony flagbearer.

== Competitors ==
The following table lists the Vietnamese delegation per sport and gender.

Sport	Men	Women	Total
Short-track speed skating	1	0	1
Total	1	0	1

== Short-track speed skating ==
Vietnam entered one male short track speed skater. Vietnam had planned to enter more skaters, however they were to young to be entered into the competition. Dương Trường Lập was the only representative of the country, and compete in three events.

Men

Athlete	Event	Heat		Quarterfinal		Semifinal		Final	
Athlete	Event	Time	Rank	Time	Rank	Time	Rank	Time	Rank
Dương Trường Lập	500 m	52.899	5	Did not advance					35
Dương Trường Lập	1000 m	2:02.714	5	Did not advance					36
Dương Trường Lập	1500 m	—N/a		3:05.572	6	Did not advance			33

== See also ==
- Vietnam at the 2024 Summer Olympics
