= Singapore at the 2025 Asian Winter Games =

- Flag of Singapore
- IOC code: SGP
- NOC: Singapore National Olympic Council

in Harbin, China 7 February 2025 – 14 February 2025
- Competitors: 23 in 3 sports
- Flag bearers: Wee Chew & Alyssa Pok
- Medals: Gold 0 Silver 0 Bronze 0 Total 0

Asian Winter Games appearances
- 2011; 2017; 2025; 2029

Singapore competed at the 2025 Asian Winter Games in Harbin, China, from February 7 to 14. Hockey player Wee Chew and short-track speed skater Alyssa Pok were the country's opening ceremony flagbearers.

== Competitors ==
The following table lists the Singaporean delegation per sport and gender.

Sport	Men	Women	Total
Alpine skiing	1	0	1
Ice hockey	18	0	18
Short-track speed skating	2	2	4
Total	21	2	23

== Alpine skiing ==
Singapore entered one male alpine skier. Faiz Basha spent the last few months training for the games in New Zealand.

Athlete	Event	Run 1		Run 2		Total	
Athlete	Event	Time	Rank	Time	Rank	Time	Rank
Faiz Basha	Men's slalom	49.04	13	48.23	12	1:37.27	12

== Ice hockey ==
=== Men's tournament ===
Singapore qualified a men's hockey team. The Singaporean team qualified after being ranked as one of the top 12 teams in Asia on the IIHF World Ranking as of May 2024.

Singapore was represented by the following 18 athletes:

- Noah Blakney (F)
- Joshua Chan (F)
- Wee Chew (D)
- Cael Chua (D)
- Ryan Goh (F)
- Brandon Gunawardena (F)
- James Kodrowski (F)
- Wei Hung Kok (D)
- Bryan Lee (F)
- Lee Chin Hao (G)
- Joshua Lee (G)
- Shaw Lee (F)
- Gabriel Lim (F)
- Richard O'Brien (D)
- Benedict Qian (D)
- Ryan Tan (F)
- Ryan Wintland (D)
- Ian Wong (F)

Legend: G = Goalie, D = Defense, F = Forward

Group stage

Pos	Team	Pld	W	OW	OL	L	GF	GA	GD	Pts	Qualification
1	Kyrgyzstan	3	2	1	0	0	49	10	+39	8	Quarterfinals
2	Kuwait	3	2	0	1	0	52	12	+40	7	Placement 9–10
3	Singapore	3	1	0	0	2	25	22	+3	3	Placement 11–12
4	Bahrain	3	0	0	0	3	1	83	−82	0	Placement 13–14

Source: OCA

3 February; 13:00	Singapore	20–1 (12–0, 5–0, 3–1)	Bahrain	Harbin Ice Hockey Arena, Harbin; Attendance: 2,517

Game reference

Joshua Lee
Lee Chin Hao
Goalies
Abdulla Al-Adhab
Referee:
Faris Hakimin Yusoff (MAS)

B. Lee (Kodrowski, Chua) – 00:50	1–0
Chan (Blakney) – 01:14	2–0
Chew (Kodrowski, Chua) – 05:09	3–0
Blakney (Goh, O'Brien) – 07:38	4–0
B. Lee (O'Brien) – 09:03	5–0
Chan (SH) – 09:41	6–0
Qian (Chan, Tan) (PP) – 12:16	7–0
Lim (Wintland) – 12:57	8–0
Gunawardena (Kok) – 13:23	9–0
Chan (O'Brien, Kodrowski) – 14:17	10–0
Wintland (Lee S., Tan) – 16:22	11–0
Lee S. (Wintland) – 16:57	12–0
Lee S. (Wintland, Chew) – 27:27	13–0
Goh (Chew) (SH) – 29:40	14–0
Gunawardena (B. Lee, Kodrowski) – 32:04	15–0
Kok (Lim, Chua) – 32:29	16–0
Chan (Blakney) – 37:02	17–0
Gunawardena (Goh, Chan) – 43:05	18–0
Lim (Lee S.) – 50:38	19–0
	19–1	53:02 – Al-Bahri
Chua (Lim, Chew) – 55:08	20–1

8 min
Penalties
6 min
59
Shots
8

5 February; 9:00	Singapore	3–10 (0–3, 0–4, 3–3)	Kuwait	Harbin Sport University Stadium, Harbin; Attendance: 383

Game reference

Joshua Lee
Goalies
Adam Barvík
Zaid Al-Saied
Referee:
Timur Morev (KAZ)

	0–1	09:26 – Vavra (Al-Awadhi, Zidarević)
	0–2	10:12 – Tsibin (Al-Khashan, Al-Khalaf)
	0–3	15:43 – Drozdetskikh (Budzevich, Al-Khalaf)
	0–4	20:51 – Tsibin (Budzevich)
	0–5	24:55 – Drozdetskikh (Budzevich, Al-Khalaf)
	0–6	25:49 – Tsibin (Vavra, Al-Awadhi) (PP)
	0–7	36:10 – Al-Awadhi (Vavra)
Chan – 41:24	1–7
	1–8	48:50 – Zidarević (Vavra)
	1–9	52:06 – Drozdetskikh (Al-Awadhi, Al-Daei) (PP)
Kodrowski (Chan) – 53:20	2–9
	2–10	54:40 – Budzevich (Drozdetskikh, Al-Mari)
Chan (Kodrowski, Chew) (PP) – 56:30	3–10

10 min
Penalties
10 min
28
Shots
47

9 February; 17:00	Kyrgyzstan	11–2 (3–1, 6–0, 2–1)	Singapore	Harbin Ice Hockey Arena, Harbin; Attendance: 2,765

Game reference

Artem Vasilev
Arslan Maraimbekov
Goalies
Joshua Lee
Referee:
Shen Yen-chin (TPE)

Seifulov (Abdyraev, Terentyev) – 02:25	1–0
Ismanov (Bekmuratov, Isamatov) – 12:53	2–0
	2–1	13:08 – Blakney (Kodrowski)
Abdyraev (Egorov, Seifulov) – 19:37	3–1
Seifulov (Leshchenko, Terentyev) – 20:56	4–1
Abdyraev (Titov, Seifulov) (PP) – 22:34	5–1
Ismanov (Mirbekov) – 24:51	6–1
Popov (Mirbekov, Ismanov) – 25:18	7–1
Titov (Seifulov, Terentyev) – 30:11	8–1
Seifulov (Terentyev, Abdyraev) (PP) – 34:42	9–1
Maksatbekov (Supokhunov, Nuraliev) – 46:12	10–1
Mirbekov (Bekmuratov, Ismanov) – 47:22	11–1
	11–2	51:04 – Chan (Goh)

2 min
Penalties
8 min
89
Shots
9

Eleventh place match

10 February; 13:00	Singapore	13–2 (5–0, 3–1, 5–1)	India	Harbin Sport University Stadium, Harbin; Attendance: 565

Game reference

Joshua Lee
Lee Chin Hao
Goalies
Lotus Chamba
Referee:
Li Ho Ching (HKG)

Kodrowski (Chua, Qian) (PP) – 07:22	1–0
B. Lee (Chua, Chan) (PP) – 09:52	2–0
B. Lee (Kodrowski, Chua) – 11:46	3–0
Qian (SH) – 14:40	4–0
B. Lee (Blakney, Kodrowski) – 17:44	5–0
Wintland (B. Lee, Qian) – 28:06	6–0
Goh (Chan) – 33:09	7–0
Kok – 34:02	8–0
	8–1	39:01 – Ismail (S. Angchok, Lakdan)
	8–2	41:09 – Lotus (Ismail, S. Angchok) (PP)
B. Lee (Kok) – 45:57	9–2
Chan (Kodrowski, Qian) (PP) – 49:33	10–2
O'Brien (Blakney) – 51:00	11–2
Chan (Chew) – 53:37	12–2
Kok (B. Lee, Wintland) – 54:12	13–2

6 min
Penalties
10 min
60
Shots
11

== Short-track speed skating ==
Singapore entered four short-track speed skaters.

Athlete	Event	Heat		Quarterfinal		Semifinal		Final	
Athlete	Event	Time	Rank	Time	Rank	Time	Rank	Time	Rank
Ryo Ong	Men's 500 m	43.741	3 q	44.349	5	Did not advance			21
Brandon Pok	Men's 500 m	44.154	3	Did not advance					21
Ryo Ong	Men's 1000 m	1:33.486	3	Did not advance					22
Brandon Pok	Men's 1000 m	Penalty		Did not advance					37
Ryo Ong	Men's 1500 m	—N/a		2:31.826	4	Did not advance			22
Brandon Pok	Men's 1500 m	—N/a		2:25.935	2 Q	2:25.294	4 QB	2:31.915	11
Amelia Chua	Women's 500 m	49.332	4	Did not advance					20
Alyssa Pok	Women's 500 m	46.728	3 Q	46.872	4	Did not advance			16
Amelia Chua	Women's 1000 m	1:47.099	4	Did not advance					19
Alyssa Pok	Women's 1000 m	1:35.822	3 Q	1:34.335	2 Q	1:35.131	4 QB	1:37.889	9
Amelia Chua	Women's 1500 m	—N/a		2:45.691	4	Did not advance			19
Alyssa Pok	Women's 1500 m	—N/a		2:46.217	3 Q	2:36.748	5	Did not advance	15
Ryo Ong; Brandon Pok; Amelia Chua; Alyssa Pok	Mixed 2000 m relay	—N/a		2:59.264	2 Q	2:55.981	4 QB	3:04.321	6
