= Malaysia at the 2025 Asian Winter Games =

- Flag of Malaysia
- IOC code: MAS
- NOC: Olympic Council of Malaysia

in Harbin, China 7 February 2025 – 14 February 2025
- Competitors: 8 in 4 sports
- Flag bearers: Wei Yan Tang & Ashley Chin
- Medals: Gold 0 Silver 0 Bronze 0 Total 0

Asian Winter Games appearances
- 2007; 2011; 2017; 2025; 2029

Malaysia competed at the 2025 Asian Winter Games in Harbin, China, from February 7 to 14.

The Malaysian team consisted of eight athletes competing in four sports. Cross-country skier Wei Yan Tang and Ashley Chin were the country's opening ceremony flagbearers.

== Competitors ==
The following table lists the Malaysian delegation per sport and gender.

Sport	Men	Women	Total
Alpine skiing	0	1	1
Cross-country skiing	1	0	1
Figure skating	2	2	4
Short-track speed skating	1	1	2
Total	4	4	8

== Alpine skiing ==
Malaysia entered one female alpine skier. Aruwin Salehhuddin would finish in fourth place in the women's slalom event, 0.7 seconds behind the bronze medalist.

Athlete	Event	Run 1		Run 2		Total	
Athlete	Event	Time	Rank	Time	Rank	Time	Rank
Aruwin Salehhuddin	Women's slalom	49.12	5	47.62	4	1:36.74	4

== Cross-country skiing ==
Malaysia entered one male cross-country skier.

Men
Distance

Athlete	Event	Final		
Athlete	Event	Time	Deficit	Rank
Wei Yan Tang	10 km freestyle	39:12.1	+18:05.6	43

Sprint

Athlete	Event	Qualification		Quarterfinals		Semifinals		Final	
Athlete	Event	Time	Rank	Time	Rank	Time	Rank	Time	Rank
Wei Yan Tang	Sprint classical	4:53.18	39	Did not advance					

== Figure skating ==
Malaysia entered four figure skaters (two per gender).

Athlete(s)	Event	SP		FP		Total	
Athlete(s)	Event	Points	Rank	Points	Rank	Points	Rank
Ze Zeng Fang	Men's	51.49	14 Q	94.71	13	146.20	13
Chun Hong Low	Men's	26.75	16 Q	58.17	14	84.92	14
Afrina Diyanah	Women's	24.29	21 Q	56.20	18	80.49	20
Kai Er Goh	Women's	19.73	23 Q	37.70	24	57.43	24

== Short-track speed skating ==
Malaysia entered two short-track speed skaters (one per gender).

Athlete	Event	Heat		Quarterfinal		Semifinal		Final	
Athlete	Event	Time	Rank	Time	Rank	Time	Rank	Time	Rank
Mohamad bin Mohamad Fadzli	Men's 500 m	49.633	4	Did not advance					31
Mohamad bin Mohamad Fadzli	Men's 1000 m	1:46.735	5	Did not advance					34
Mohamad bin Mohamad Fadzli	Men's 1500 m	—N/a		Did not start					
Ashley Chin	Women's 500 m	53.100	5	Did not advance					23
Ashley Chin	Women's 1000 m	1:50.403	5	Did not advance					22
Ashley Chin	Women's 1500 m	—N/a		Did not start					
