= Short-track speed skating at the 2025 Asian Winter Games – Women's 1000 metres =

Women's 1000 metres at the 2025 Asian Winter Games
- Venue: Heilongjiang Multifunctional Hall
- Dates: 7–9 February 2025
- Competitors: 24 from 11 nations

Medalists
| gold medal | Choi Min-jeong | South Korea |
| silver medal | Kim Gil-li | South Korea |
| bronze medal | Zhang Chutong | China |

The women's 1000 metres competition in short-track speed skating at the 2025 Asian Winter Games was held on 7 and 9 February 2025 in Harbin, China.

== Schedule ==
All times are China Standard Time (UTC+08:00)

| Date | Time | Event |
|---|---|---|
| Friday, 7 February 2025 | 11:04 | Heats |
| Sunday, 9 February 2025 | 10:00 | Quarterfinals |
| Sunday, 9 February 2025 | 10:47 | Semifinals |
| Sunday, 9 February 2025 | 11:20 | Finals |

== Results ==
Legend

- ADV — Advanced
- PEN — Penalty

=== Heats ===
- Qualification: 1–3 + Best 4 → Quarterfinals (Q + q)

==== Heat 1 ====
| Rank | Athlete | Time | Notes |
|---|---|---|---|
| 1 | Zhang Chutong (CHN) | 1:40.674 | Q |
| 2 | Olga Tikhonova (KAZ) | 1:40.731 | Q |
| 3 | Miyu Miyashita (JPN) | 1:41.331 | Q |
| 4 | Chang Wan-ting (TPE) | 1:42.917 | |

==== Heat 2 ====
| Rank | Athlete | Time | Notes |
|---|---|---|---|
| 1 | Shim Suk-hee (KOR) | 1:35.014 | Q |
| 2 | Yang Jingru (CHN) | 1:35.107 | Q |
| 3 | Rina Shimada (JPN) | 1:35.423 | Q |
| 4 | Alina Azhgaliyeva (KAZ) | 1:35.431 | q |
| 5 | Chung Hsiao-ying (TPE) | 1:38.777 | |

==== Heat 3 ====
| Rank | Athlete | Time | Notes |
|---|---|---|---|
| 1 | Kim Gil-li (KOR) | 1:37.829 | Q |
| 2 | Thanutchaya Chatthaisong (THA) | 1:38.799 | Q |
| 3 | Battulgyn Gereltuyaa (MGL) | 1:41.324 | Q |
| 4 | Varsha S. Puranik (IND) | 1:49.271 | |
| 5 | Ashley Chin (MAS) | 1:50.403 | |

==== Heat 4 ====
| Rank | Athlete | Time | Notes |
|---|---|---|---|
| 1 | Choi Min-jeong (KOR) | 1:31.643 | Q |
| 2 | Lam Ching Yan (HKG) | 1:31.786 | Q |
| 3 | Alyssa Pok (SGP) | 1:35.822 | Q |
| 4 | Punpreeda Prempreecha (THA) | 1:39.922 | |
| 5 | Dashiel Concessao (IND) | 1:51.620 | |

==== Heat 5 ====
| Rank | Athlete | Time | Notes |
|---|---|---|---|
| 1 | Gong Li (CHN) | 1:34.991 | Q |
| 2 | Malika Yermek (KAZ) | 1:35.228 | Q |
| 3 | Kurumi Shimane (JPN) | 1:35.345 | Q |
| 4 | Amelia Chua (SGP) | 1:47.099 | |
| 5 | Swarali Deo (IND) | 1:54.962 | |

=== Quarterfinals ===
- Qualification: 1–2 + Two best 3 → Semifinals (Q + q)

==== Heat 1 ====
| Rank | Athlete | Time | Notes |
|---|---|---|---|
| 1 | Choi Min-jeong (KOR) | 1:31.214 | Q |
| 2 | Alina Azhgaliyeva (KAZ) | 1:32.235 | Q |
| 3 | Malika Yermek (KAZ) | 1:32.306 | q |
| 4 | Thanutchaya Chatthaisong (THA) | 1:32.588 | |

==== Heat 2 ====
| Rank | Athlete | Time | Notes |
|---|---|---|---|
| 1 | Gong Li (CHN) | 1:32.671 | Q |
| 2 | Yang Jingru (CHN) | 1:32.769 | Q |
| 3 | Olga Tikhonova (KAZ) | 1:32.943 | |
| 4 | Miyu Miyashita (JPN) | 1:33.460 | |

==== Heat 3 ====
| Rank | Athlete | Time | Notes |
|---|---|---|---|
| 1 | Shim Suk-hee (KOR) | 1:34.926 | Q |
| 2 | Kurumi Shimane (JPN) | 1:35.015 | Q |
| 3 | Lam Ching Yan (HKG) | 1:35.088 | |
| 4 | Battulgyn Gereltuyaa (MGL) | 1:40.249 | |

==== Heat 4 ====
| Rank | Athlete | Time | Notes |
|---|---|---|---|
| 1 | Zhang Chutong (CHN) | 1:31.341 | Q |
| 2 | Alyssa Pok (SGP) | 1:34.335 | Q |
| 3 | Rina Shimada (JPN) | 1:57.083 | |
| 4 | Kim Gil-li (KOR) | 2:09.121 | ADV |

=== Semifinals ===
- Qualification: 1–2 + Best 3 → Final A (QA), Next best five → Final B (QB)

==== Heat 1 ====
| Rank | Athlete | Time | Notes |
|---|---|---|---|
| 1 | Choi Min-jeong (KOR) | 1:29.835 | QA |
| 2 | Shim Suk-hee (KOR) | 1:30.017 | QA |
| 3 | Alina Azhgaliyeva (KAZ) | 1:30.152 | QB |
| 4 | Malika Yermek (KAZ) | 1:33.771 | ADVA |
| — | Yang Jingru (CHN) | PEN | |

==== Heat 2 ====
| Rank | Athlete | Time | Notes |
|---|---|---|---|
| 1 | Kim Gil-li (KOR) | 1:31.194 | QA |
| 2 | Zhang Chutong (CHN) | 1:31.357 | QA |
| 3 | Kurumi Shimane (JPN) | 1:31.718 | QB |
| 4 | Alyssa Pok (SGP) | 1:35.131 | QB |
| 5 | Gong Li (CHN) | 2:15.047 | QB |

=== Finals ===
==== Final B ====
| Rank | Athlete | Time |
|---|---|---|
| 1 | Gong Li (CHN) | 1:36.756 |
| 2 | Alina Azhgaliyeva (KAZ) | 1:36.884 |
| 3 | Kurumi Shimane (JPN) | 1:36.951 |
| 4 | Alyssa Pok (SGP) | 1:37.889 |

==== Final A ====
| Rank | Athlete | Time |
|---|---|---|
| 1st place, gold medalist(s) | Choi Min-jeong (KOR) | 1:29.637 |
| 2nd place, silver medalist(s) | Kim Gil-li (KOR) | 1:29.739 |
| 3rd place, bronze medalist(s) | Zhang Chutong (CHN) | 1:29.836 |
| 4 | Shim Suk-hee (KOR) | 1:29.994 |
| 5 | Malika Yermek (KAZ) | 1:30.167 |
