= Indonesia at the 2025 Asian Winter Games =

- Flag of Indonesia
- IOC code: INA
- NOC: Indonesian Olympic Committee

in Harbin, China 7 February 2025 – 14 February 2025
- Competitors: 6 in 2 sports
- Flag bearer: Dwiki Eka Ramadhan & Kelly Supangat
- Medals: Gold 0 Silver 0 Bronze 0 Total 0

Asian Winter Games appearances
- 2017; 2025; 2029

Indonesia competed at the 2025 Asian Winter Games in Harbin, China, from February 7 to 14. The Indonesian team is scheduled to consist of six athletes. The six athletes (three per gender) competed in two sports. Figure skaters Dwiki Eka Ramadhan and Kelly Supangat were the country's opening ceremony flagbearers.

== Competitors ==
The following table lists the Indonesian delegation per sport and gender.

Sport	Men	Women	Total
Figure skating	1	3	4
Short-track speed skating	2	0	2
Total	3	3	6

== Figure skating ==
Indonesia entered four figure skaters (one man and three women).

Athlete(s)	Event	SP/RD		FP/FD		Total	
Athlete(s)	Event	Points	Rank	Points	Rank	Points	Rank
Michelle Edgina Axille	Women's	Did not start					
Kelly Supangat	Women's	30.58	17	67.77	16	98.35	16
Dwiki Eka Ramadhan; Tasya Putri Permatasari	Ice dance	35.51	6	54.63	6	90.14	6

== Short-track speed skating ==
Indonesia entered two male short-track speed skaters.

Men

Athlete	Event	Heat		Quarterfinal		Semifinal		Final	
Athlete	Event	Time	Rank	Time	Rank	Time	Rank	Time	Rank
Arsa Firdaus	Men's 500 m	46.054	4	Did not advance					30
Marva Firdaus	Men's 500 m	43.898	4	Did not advance					25
Arsa Firdaus	Men's 1000 m	1:37.456	4	Did not advance					28
Marva Firdaus	Men's 1000 m	1:32.880	4	Did not advance					25
Arsa Firdaus	Men's 1500 m	—		2:32.305	5	Did not advance			26
Marva Firdaus	Men's 1500 m	—		2:34.706	5	Did not advance			28
