= Short-track speed skating at the 2017 Winter Universiade =

Short track speed skating at the XXVIII Winter Universiade
- Venue: Baluan Sholak Sports Palace
- Dates: 5–7 February 2017

Short track speed skating at the 2017 Winter Universiade was held from 5 to 7 February at the Baluan Sholak Sports Palace in Almaty, Kazakhstan.

== Medal table ==
Rank	Nation	Gold	Silver	Bronze	Total
1	South Korea	6	3	1	10
2	China	2	3	0	5
3	Kazakhstan	0	1	5	6
4	Russia	0	1	0	1
5	Japan	0	0	2	2
Totals (5 entries)		8	8	8	24

== Men's events ==
Event	Gold		Silver		Bronze	
500 metres	Kim Do-kyoum (KOR)	41.175	Abzal Azhgaliyev (KAZ)	41.479	Denis Nikisha (KAZ)	58.169
1000 metres	Lim Kyoung-won (KOR)	1:28.024	Park Ji-won (KOR)	1:28.051	Denis Nikisha (KAZ)	1:28.189
1500 metres	Park Ji-won (KOR)	2:30.622	Kim Do-kyoum (KOR)	2:30.773	Nurbergen Zhumagaziyev (KAZ)	2:31.287
5000 metres relay	China (CHN); Chen Guang; Song Haochen; Xu Fu; Yu Wei; Zhang Hongchao	7:04.443	Russia (RUS); Artem Denisov; Andrey Mikhasev; Kirill Shashin; Timur Zakharov	7:04.551	Kazakhstan (KAZ); Abzal Azhgaliyev; Aidar Bekzhanov; Denis Nikisha; Nurbergen Zhumagaziyev	7:13.799

== Women's events ==
Event	Gold		Silver		Bronze	
500 metres	Zang Yize (CHN)	44.015	Xu Aili (CHN)	44.124	Kim A-lang (KOR)	44.191
1000 metres	Son Ha-kyung (KOR)	1:33.858	Xu Aili (CHN)	1:34.013	Ayame Nakano (JPN)	1:36.248
1500 metres	Son Ha-kyung (KOR)	2:34.591	Kim A-lang (KOR)	2:35.010	Moemi Kikuchi (JPN)	2:35.251
3000 metres relay	South Korea (KOR); Kim A-lang; Hwang Hyun-sun; Noh Do-hee; Son Ha-kyung; Kang Ji-hee	4:13.630	China (CHN); Sun Yingying; Zang Yize; Xu Aili; Zhang Xiyang; Sun Xinlin	4:13.808	Kazakhstan (KAZ); Kim Iong-a; Anastassiya Krestova; Madina Zhanbussinova; Anita Nagay; Olga Tikhonova	4:18.369
