= Figure skating at the 2025 Asian Winter Games – Women's singles =

Women's singles at the 2025 Asian Winter Games
- Venue: Heilongjiang Multifunctional Hall
- Dates: 12–13 February 2025
- Competitors: 25 from 14 nations

Medalists
gold medal	Kim Chae-yeon	South Korea
silver medal	Kaori Sakamoto	Japan
bronze medal	Hana Yoshida	Japan

The women's singles event at the 2025 Asian Winter Games was held on 12 and 13 February 2025 at the Heilongjiang Ice Events Training Centre Multifunctional Hall in Harbin, China.

== Schedule ==
All times are China Standard Time (UTC+08:00)

Date	Time	Event
Wednesday, 12 February 2025	13:30	Short program
Thursday, 13 February 2025	13:00	Free skating

== Results ==
Rank	Athlete	SP	FS	Total
1st place, gold medalist(s)	Kim Chae-yeon (KOR)	71.88	147.56	219.44
2nd place, silver medalist(s)	Kaori Sakamoto (JPN)	75.03	136.87	211.90
3rd place, bronze medalist(s)	Hana Yoshida (JPN)	68.76	136.44	205.20
4	Sofia Samodelkina (KAZ)	63.31	125.12	188.43
5	Zhu Yi (CHN)	62.90	105.96	168.86
6	An Xiangyi (CHN)	62.96	98.75	161.71
7	Kim Seo-young (KOR)	51.23	99.31	150.54
8	Tara Prasad (IND)	49.17	99.17	148.34
9	Cathryn Limketkai (PHI)	45.28	91.91	137.19
10	Sofiya Farafonova (KAZ)	45.63	79.64	125.27
11	Sofia Frank (PHI)	43.55	76.50	120.05
12	Joanna So (HKG)	36.22	76.52	112.74
13	Larisa Wahitowa (TKM)	37.56	74.68	112.24
14	Chow Hiu Yau (HKG)	38.11	73.73	111.84
15	Daria Snegovskaia (KGZ)	40.21	66.60	106.81
16	Kelly Supangat (INA)	30.58	67.77	98.35
17	Niginabonu Jamoliddinova (UZB)	27.88	67.81	95.69
18	Gansükhiin Maral-Erdene (MGL)	30.64	54.72	85.36
19	Otgonbaataryn Misheel (MGL)	26.32	55.30	81.62
20	Afrina Diyanah (MAS)	24.29	56.20	80.49
21	Teekhree Silpa-archa (THA)	25.15	44.95	70.10
22	Sevinch Rakhimova (UZB)	18.09	51.63	69.72
23	Vipanun Hetrakul (THA)	22.17	39.99	62.16
24	Goh Kai Er (MAS)	19.73	37.70	57.43
25	Aýna Ekaýewa (TKM)	16.97		
