= Li Wenlong (speed skater) =

Chinese speed skater (born 2001)

Personal information
- Nationality: Chinese
- Born: 4 February 2001 (age 25) Fushun, Liaoning, China

Sport
- Country: China
- Sport: Short track speed skating
- Club: Shandong
Medal record
Men's short-track speed skating
Representing China
Olympic Games
Silver medal – second place	2022 Beijing	1000 m
World Championships
Gold medal – first place	2023 Seoul	5000 m relay
Gold medal – first place	2024 Rotterdam	5000 m relay
Silver medal – second place	2023 Seoul	2000 m mixed relay
Silver medal – second place	2025 Beijing	5000 m relay
Asian Games
Bronze medal – third place	2025 Harbin	5000 m relay
World Junior Championships
Gold medal – first place	2019 Montreal	3000 m relay

Li Wenlong (born 4 February 2001) is a Chinese short track speed-skater. He represented China at the 2022 Winter Olympics.

== Career ==
Wenlong represented China at the 2022 Winter Olympics in the men's 1000 metres event and won a silver medal.

In January 2026, he was selected to represent China at the 2026 Winter Olympics.
