= Short-track speed skating at the 2025 Asian Winter Games – Women's 3000 metre relay =

Women's 3000 metre relay at the 2025 Asian Winter Games
- Venue: Heilongjiang Multifunctional Hall
- Dates: 9 February 2025
- Competitors: 28 from 5 nations

Medalists
gold medal	China; Fan Kexin, Gong Li, Zhang Chutong, Wang Xinran, Zang Yize, Yang Jingru
silver medal	Kazakhstan; Olga Tikhonova, Yana Khan, Alina Azhgaliyeva, Malika Yermek, Zeinep Kumarkan, Madina Zhanbussinova
bronze medal	Japan; Rina Shimada, Yuki Ishikawa, Haruna Nagamori, Riho Inuzuka, Miyu Miyashita, Kurumi Shimane

The women's 3000 metre relay competition in short-track speed skating at the 2025 Asian Winter Games was held on 9 February 2025 in Harbin, China.

== Schedule ==
All times are China Standard Time (UTC+08:00)

Date	Time	Event
Sunday, 9 February 2025	11:55	Semifinals
Sunday, 9 February 2025	12:46	Final

== Results ==
=== Semifinals ===
- Qualification: 1 + Next two best → Final (Q + q)

==== Heat 1 ====
Rank	Team	Time	Notes
1	China; Zang Yize; Fan Kexin; Wang Xinran; Yang Jingru	4:13.862	Q
2	Kazakhstan; Olga Tikhonova; Zeinep Kumarkan; Yana Khan; Madina Zhanbussinova	4:14.268	q

==== Heat 2 ====
Rank	Team	Time	Notes
1	South Korea; Kim Geon-hee; Lee So-yeon; Noh Do-hee; Shim Suk-hee	4:13.944	Q
2	Japan; Miyu Miyashita; Haruna Nagamori; Kurumi Shimane; Riho Inuzuka	4:26.093	q
3	India; Varsha S. Puranik; Suvarnika Radhakrishnan; Dashiel Concessao; Sai Sahana	5:16.173	

=== Final ===
Rank	Team	Time
1st place, gold medalist(s)	China; Fan Kexin; Gong Li; Zhang Chutong; Wang Xinran	4:11.371
2nd place, silver medalist(s)	Kazakhstan; Olga Tikhonova; Yana Khan; Alina Azhgaliyeva; Malika Yermek	4:13.498
3rd place, bronze medalist(s)	Japan; Rina Shimada; Yuki Ishikawa; Haruna Nagamori; Riho Inuzuka	4:13.578
4	South Korea; Kim Geon-hee; Kim Gil-li; Lee So-yeon; Choi Min-jeong	4:16.683
