= Kim Do-kyoum =

South Korean short track speedskater

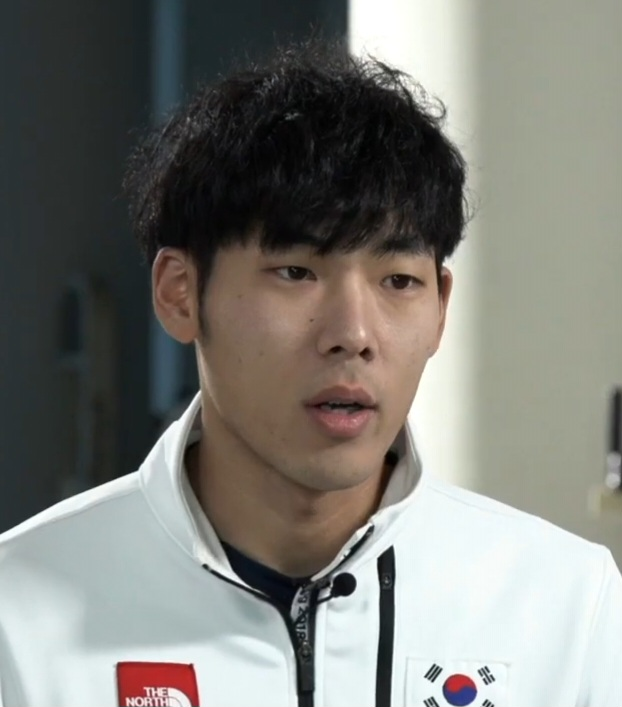
- Kim in 2020

Personal information
- Born: 15 March 1993 (age 33) Seoul, South Korea
- Height: 1.82 m (6 ft 0 in)
- Weight: 80 kg (176 lb)

Sport
- Country: South Korea
- Sport: Short track speed skating
Medal record
Men's short track speed skating
Representing South Korea
World Championships
| Gold medal – first place | 2018 Montreal | 5000 m relay |
Universiade
| Gold medal – first place | 2017 Almaty | 500 m |
| Silver medal – second place | 2017 Almaty | 1500 m |

Korean name
- Hangul: 김도겸
- RR: Gim Dogyeom
- MR: Kim Togyŏm

Kim Do-kyoum (Korean: 김도겸; born 15 March 1993) is a South Korean short track speed skater. He competed in the 2018 Winter Olympics.

== Public image ==
In South Korea, he has been nicknamed "Park Bo-gum of Speed Skating", reflecting the esteem he has in his field.
