= Reinis Bērziņš =

Latvian short track skater (born 2001)

Personal information
- Born: 10 July 2001 (age 24) Riga, Latvia
- Height: 175 cm (5 ft 9 in)
- Weight: 69 kg (152 lb)

Sport
- Country: Latvia
- Sport: Short-track speed skating
- Club: SK Zemgale (Jelgava) and later training at a short track Centre of Excellence in Heerenveen (Netherlands).
- Coached by: Agne Sereikaite
Medal record
Two bronze medal's at European Championships (2022/2023), Gdańsk, Poland, men's 500 m. Two bronze medal's at ISU World Cup, Men's 1500 m (2022/2023) Salt Lake City, United States. Men's 1500 m (2023/2024) Montreal, Canada.

Reinis Bērziņš (born 10 July 2001) is a Latvian short-track speed skater who has competed internationally, including at the Winter Olympic Games, World Cup, European Championships and other major events.

== Early life ==
Bērziņš was born in Riga, Latvia, and grew up in Ozolnieki. He took up the sport in 2010 in Ozolnieki, Latvia. According to Bērziņš in an interview, at around 10 or 11 years old, he competed in his first Danubia Series event. Even though he had poor-quality blades, it gave him his first real feeling for short track.

== Career ==
=== Junior career ===
Bērziņš represented Latvia at ISU junior competitions, including the World Junior Championships.

=== Senior career ===
Bērziņš began competing regularly on the ISU Short Track Speed Skating World Cup circuit. He competes primarily in the 500 metres, 1000 metres and 1500 metres events.

During the 2022–23 ISU World Cup season, he won a bronze medal in the 1500 metres.

At the 2023 European Short Track Speed Skating Championships in Gdańsk, Poland, he won a bronze medal in the 500 metres.

=== Olympic participation ===
Bērziņš represented Latvia at the 2022 Winter Olympics in Beijing, China, competing in the men's 1500 metres, where he finished 15th overall.

He later competed at the 2026 Winter Olympics in Milan and Cortina d'Ampezzo, Italy, finishing 24th in men's 500 metres and 14th in men's 1000 metres.
