= ISKATE =

Ice skating rink in Gurugram, India

Coordinates: 28.503052°N 77.096884°E

iSKATE is an ice skating rink and café located on the 6th floor of the Ambience Mall in Gurugram, India. The skating rink is 15,000 sq. feet and was established on 18 December 2011.

According to Ice Skating Association of India, the rink is one of the best among the very few indoor ice skating rinks in the country.

== See also ==
- Dominence of Haryana in sports
