= Lim Hyo-jun =

Chinese speed skater (born 1996)

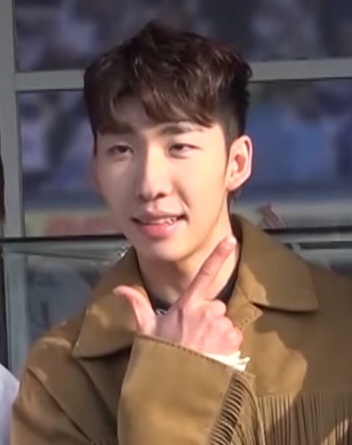

Personal information
- Nationality: Chinese
- Born: 29 May 1996 (age 30) Daegu, South Korea
- Height: 1.68 m (5 ft 6 in)
- Weight: 64 kg (141 lb)

Sport
- Country: South Korea (until 2021); China (since 2021)
- Sport: Short track speed skating
- Events: 1000 m, 1500 m
- Club: Korea National Sport University (2017–2021)

Achievements and titles
- Personal bests: 500m: 39.67 (2018); 1000m: 1:22.283 (2018); 1500m: 2:10.485 (2018); 3000m: 5:00.998 (2019)
Medal record
Men's short track speed skating
Representing China
World Championships
Gold medal – first place	2023 Seoul	5000 m relay
Gold medal – first place	2024 Rotterdam	500 m
Gold medal – first place	2024 Rotterdam	5000 m relay
Gold medal – first place	2024 Rotterdam	2000 m mixed relay
Silver medal – second place	2023 Seoul	2000 m mixed relay
Asian Winter Games
Gold medal – first place	2025 Harbin	500 m
Silver medal – second place	2025 Harbin	1500 m
Bronze medal – third place	2025 Harbin	5000 m relay
Representing South Korea
Olympic Games
Gold medal – first place	2018 Pyeongchang	1500 m
Bronze medal – third place	2018 Pyeongchang	500 m
World Championships
Gold medal – first place	2018 Montreal	5000 m relay
Gold medal – first place	2019 Sofia	Overall
Gold medal – first place	2019 Sofia	1000 m
Gold medal – first place	2019 Sofia	1500 m
Gold medal – first place	2019 Sofia	5000 m relay
Silver medal – second place	2018 Montreal	1000 m
Silver medal – second place	2018 Montreal	1500 m
Youth Olympic Games
Gold medal – first place	2012 Innsbruck	1000 m
Silver medal – second place	2012 Innsbruck	500 m

- Lim Hyo-jun
- Hangul: 임효준
- Hanja: 林孝俊
- RR: Im Hyojun
- MR: Im Hyojun

Lim Hyo-jun
- Chinese: 林孝埈
Transcriptions
Standard Mandarin
- Hanyu Pinyin: Lín Xiàojùn

Chinese Korean name
- Chosŏn'gŭl: 림효준
Transcriptions
- Revised Romanization: Rim Hyojun
- McCune–Reischauer: Rim Hyojun

South Korean name
- Hangul: 린샤오쥔
Transcriptions
- Revised Romanization: Rin Shaojwin
- McCune–Reischauer: Rin Shaojwin

Lin Xiaojun (Chinese: 林孝埈; pinyin: Lín Xiàojùn), born Lim Hyo-jun (Korean: 임효준; Hanja: 林孝俊, born 29 May 1996), is a South Korean-born Chinese short track speed skater. He is the 2018 champion of the Men's 1500 m event in short track speed skating at the Winter Olympics, and also set the new Olympic record for the event. Originally starting as a swimmer, Lim took up skating at a young age. Despite multiple injuries early on in his career, he notably won gold at the 2012 Winter Youth Olympics upon his international debut in the Boys' 1000 m event. He would later win the 1000 m and 1500 m events in the Budapest leg of the 2017–18 ISU Short Track Speed Skating World Cup and earn selection for the 2018 Winter Olympics in Pyeongchang. Upon his Olympic debut, Lim won the gold medal, setting a new Olympic record of 2:10.485 in the process, beating Lee Jung-su's previous record set at the 2010 games.

== Career ==
=== 2012–2019: South Korea representation ===
==== Early years, Winter Youth Olympics ====
Lim Hyo-jun started competing as a swimmer, but later switched to short track speed skating after suffering damage to his tympanum. During his early career during middle school, he underwent seven surgeries after many injuries sustained during competitions caused numerous hiatuses, including a period in which Lim did not compete for a year, following a leg injury. During his early career, Lim represented South Korea in his first international competition at the 2012 Winter Youth Olympics in Innsbruck. There, he won the gold medal on his debut in the Boys' 1000 m event, and the silver medal behind fellow South Korean Yoon Su-min in the Boys' 500 m event. In the unique Mixed team relay event, where athletes of different countries and sexes competed together, Lim's "Team H" reached the gold medal final, but ultimately did not place after they were penalised for dropping the baton during the race.

==== Universiade, World Cup, Winter Olympics ====
After a four-year absence from international competition, Lim returned during the 2017 Winter Universiade in Almaty, once again representing South Korea. He competed in the Men's 500 m event, where he reached the final following respective first and second-place finishes in the heats and quarterfinals, and the disqualification of Kazakhstan's Nurbergen Zhumagaziyev for obstructing Lim in the semifinal. In the final, however, Lim failed to make a podium finish, placing fourth behind South Korea's Kim Do-kyoum and Kazakhstan's Abzal Azhgaliyev and Denis Nikisha. In the Men's 5000 m relay event, the South Korean team, which initially didn't include Lim due to his occupation with the 500 m event the same day of the semifinal, were successful in qualifying for the final. Lim was chosen to replace Lee Mun-hyeon for the final race the next day, though they were ultimately unsuccessful, conceding a penalty in a performance that would've otherwise saw them place third.

Prior to his debut at the 2018 Winter Olympics, Lim won the 1000 m and 1500 m events at the September 2017 Budapest leg of the 2017–18 ISU Short Track Speed Skating World Cup, where he placed ahead of fellow South Korean skater Hwang Dae-heon both times. In the same leg, Lim also placed second in the 500m event ahead of Hwang and behind Hungary's Sándor Liu Shaolin. Lim continued on to the Seoul leg of the World Cup in November, where he was relatively less successful, reaching only the placement final in the 500 m event, and being disqualified in the 1000 m event following a collision with Russia's Alexander Shulginov in the quarterfinal. Lim reached the gold medal final of the 1500 m event, but was also similarly disqualified. He solely found success during the Seoul leg through the South Korean 5000 m relay team, alongside Seo Yi-ra, Kwak Yoon-gy, and Kim Do-kyoum, placing second in their heat and semifinal, before winning the final race.

At the 2018 Winter Olympics, Lim Hyo-jun competed in the Men's 1500 m event, and is due to compete as part of the Korean team for the Men's 5000 m relay. In the heats of the individual 1500 m event, Lim placed first in a race that saw Japan's Kazuki Yoshinaga disqualified after a stumble; Hungary's Shaoang Liu, who placed fourth, qualified with Lim to the semifinals. In the semifinals, Lim again placed first along with fellow Korean Hwang Dae-heon, who placed second behind him. In the gold medal final, Canada's Charles Hamelin collided with Hwang with three laps left in the race, leaving Lim the last Korean in the field. He nevertheless finished the race seven hundredths of a second ahead of the Netherlands' Sjinkie Knegt, the World record holder, to claim the gold medal in the event; the third time in the event's history that a South Korean had placed first. Lim also claimed the Olympic record for the event, recording a time of 2:10.485 in the final, beating Lee Jung-su's record of 2:10.949 set at the 2010 Winter Olympics in Vancouver.

In 2020, Lim was convicted of sexual harassment after pulling down another male athlete's pants in front of female teammates in 2019. Following the conviction, Lim was banned from competing for the South Korean national team. The conviction was overturned when he was later found not guilty by the appellate court, which the Supreme Court of Korea affirmed in June 2021. It was found that the purported male victim was behaving aggressively toward the women present, and that Lim's pulling of his pants happened in a playful circumstance where everyone was fooling around.

=== 2021–present: China representation ===
After not being able to continue his career in South Korea due to the now-overturned sexual harassment charges, in March 2021, at the invitation of the Chinese Skating Association, Lim applied for Chinese citizenship in order to represent China at the 2022 Beijing Winter Olympics. However, immediate reappearance at the 2022 Olympics required an agreement with Korean Skating Union (KSU) to waive the 3-year transfer waiting period. (Note: Per Olympic Charter, bye-law to Rule 41, Nationality of competitors, Paragraph 2 - "A competitor who has represented one country in the Olympic Games, in continental or regional games or in world or regional championships recognised by the relevant IF, and who has changed his nationality or acquired a new nationality, may participate in the Olympic Games to represent his new country provided that at least three years have passed since the competitor last represented his former country. This period may be reduced or even cancelled, with the agreement of the NOCs and IF concerned, by the IOC Executive Board, which takes into account the circumstances of each case.") The International Skating Union eventually cleared the transfer in July 2022, after the Winter Olympics was over.

However, according to the South Korean newspaper The Chosun Ilbo, Lin Xiaojun could not receive the pension, contrary to Viktor Ahn, who received all the Olympic medal pensions (sports pensions). The difference is that he decided to naturalise to China when he was disciplined by the Korean Skating Union and in a trial in South Korea.

Lin Xiaojun said in an interview with South Korean media that he respects Viktor Ahn and is a role model. Kim Sun-tae coached him at the 2018 Pyeongchang Olympics. Suspicions were raised that the two played a role in Lin Xiaojun's decision to naturalize from China, Some South Korean media reported the allegations after his naturalization and during the 2022 Beijing Olympics. However, the South Korean ice skating officials insisted that coach Kim and Ahn were not involved in Lin Xiaojun's naturalization process in China, according to one of the major Korean newspapers, the Chosun Ilbo. Naturalization to China is a problem that cannot be intervened beyond the discretion of coach Kim Sun-tae and Viktor Ahn.

In March 2022, Kim Sun-tae said Korean media that he had never been involved in Lin Xiaojun's naturalization to China.

Making his debut representation under his Chinese name, Lin Xiaojun, at 2022–23 ISU Short Track Speed Skating World Cup, he was injured at the Montreal leg while competing in the mixed team relay and had to pulled out from subsequent events at the Montreal leg. He was not on the roster for the Salt Lake leg due to the injury.

At the 5th event of 2022-23 ISU World Cup, Lin Xiaojun won his first gold medal, as a Chinese, in the 500m discipline; and later won his second gold medal along with his teammates in the 5000m men's relay disciple.

At the 6th event of 2022-23 ISU World Cup, Lin Xiaojun won another gold medal in the 500m discipline, and a silver medal in the 5000m men relay discipline. After a strong comeback, Lin posted on social media sites Weibo, Xiaohongshu and Instagram mentioning that he will "work harder to come back better", for the 2023 Short track speed skating world championships scheduled to be held in Seoul, South Korea.

In the 2023 World Short Track Speed Skating Championships, Lin won the gold medal in the 5000m men relay and a silver medal in the 2000 mixed relay, along with his teammates.

== Statistics ==
=== Personal bests ===
Date	Event	Record	Location
Nov 11, 2018	500m	39.670	(United States) Salt Lake City
Mar 18, 2018	1000m	1:22.283	(Canada) Montreal
Feb 10, 2018	1500m	2:10.485	(South Korea) Gangneung
Mar 10, 2019	3000m	5:00.998	(Bulgaria) Sofia

=== Winter Olympics ===
Representing	Year	Competition	Location	Event	Position	Time
South Korea	2018	Winter Olympic Games	Pyeongchang, South Korea	Men's 1500m – Heat 4	1st	2:13.891
South Korea	2018	Winter Olympic Games	Pyeongchang, South Korea	Men's 1500m – Semifinal 3	1st	2:11.389
South Korea	2018	Winter Olympic Games	Pyeongchang, South Korea	Men's 1500m – Final A	1st	2:10.485 (OR)
South Korea	2012	Winter Youth Olympic Games	Innsbruck, Austria	Boys' 1000m – Quarterfinal 3	1st	1:32.445
South Korea	2012	Winter Youth Olympic Games	Innsbruck, Austria	Boys' 1000m – Semifinal AB 1	1st	1:29.442
South Korea	2012	Winter Youth Olympic Games	Innsbruck, Austria	Boys' 1000m – Final A	1st	1:29.284
South Korea	2012	Winter Youth Olympic Games	Innsbruck, Austria	Boys' 500m – Quarterfinal 2	1st	44.291
South Korea	2012	Winter Youth Olympic Games	Innsbruck, Austria	Boys' 500m – Semifinal AB 1	2nd	42.911
South Korea	2012	Winter Youth Olympic Games	Innsbruck, Austria	Boys' 500m – Final A	2nd	42.482
South Korea	2012	Winter Youth Olympic Games	Innsbruck, Austria	Mixed team relay – Semifinal 1	2nd	4:26.027
South Korea	2012	Winter Youth Olympic Games	Innsbruck, Austria	Mixed team relay – Final A	PEN	—

== See also ==
- List of Olympic medalists in short track speed skating
- List of Youth Olympic Games gold medalists who won Olympic gold medals
