= Zhang Chutong =

Chinese speed skater (born 2003)

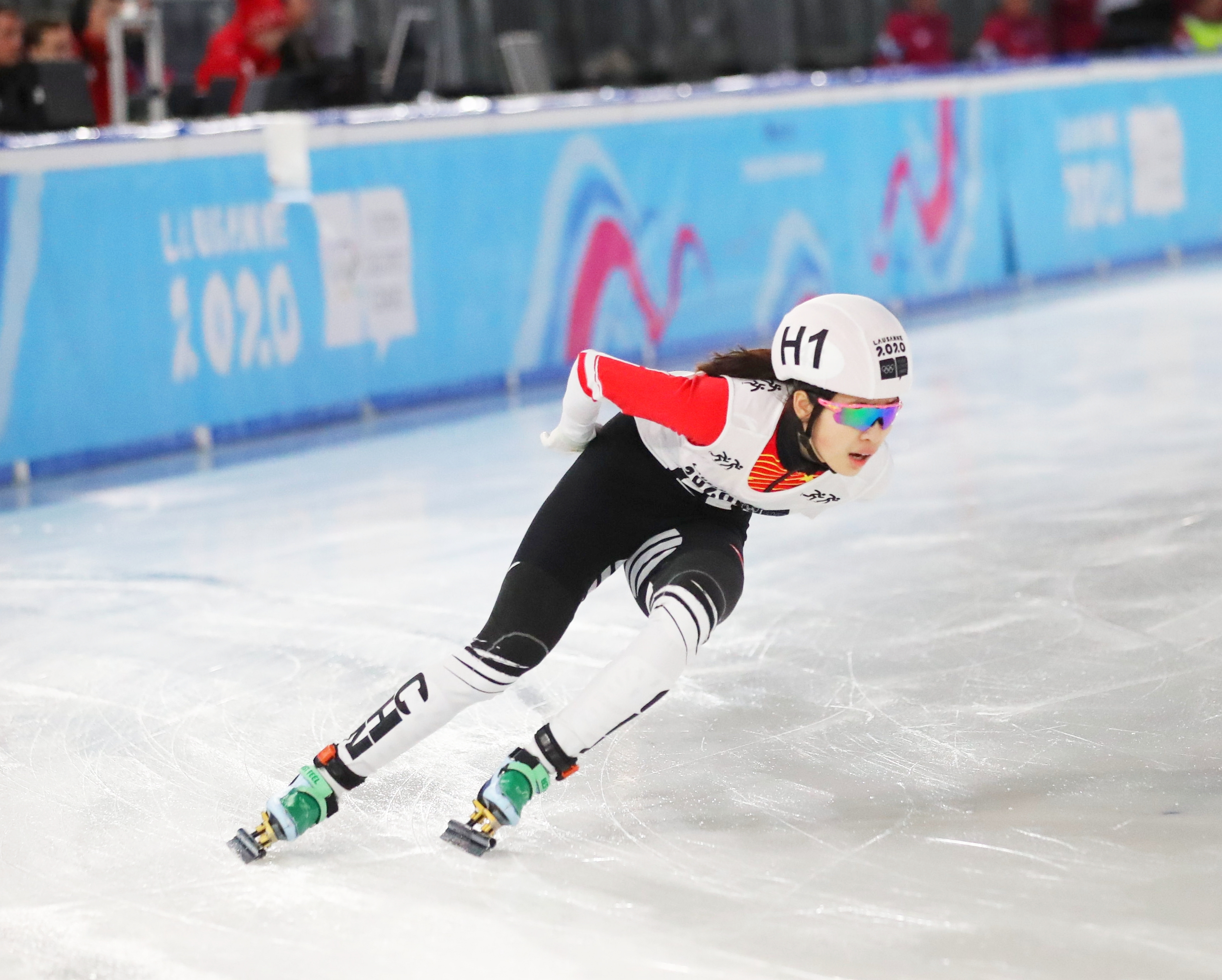
- Zhang at the 2020 Winter Youth Olympics

Personal information
- Born: 17 February 2003 (age 23) Jilin City, Jilin, China

Sport
- Country: China
- Sport: Short track speed skating
Medal record
Women's short-track speed skating
Representing China
Olympic Games
| Bronze medal – third place | 2022 Beijing | 3000 m relay |
World Championships
| Bronze medal – third place | 2026 Montreal | 3000 m relay |
Asian Winter Games
| Gold medal – first place | 2025 Harbin | 3000 m relay |
| Bronze medal – third place | 2025 Harbin | 1000 m |

Zhang Chutong (Chinese: 张楚彤; pinyin: Zhāng Chǔtóng; born 17 February 2003) is a Chinese short track speed skater. She won a bronze medal in the women's 3000 metre relay at the 2022 Winter Olympics. Since 2019, she has been a student of the Department of Physical Education at Northeast Normal University. She will serve as one of the flag bearers for Team China at the 2026 Milano Cortina Winter Olympic's opening ceremony.

== Career ==
Zhang took up short track speed skating at the age of 8 in Jilin in 2011. She joined the national team in 2018 and made her debut in Almaty at the World Cup in December 2018, where she won a bronze medal in the mixed relay with the team, and took 3rd place in the 1000m at the Dresden stage in February 2019. She became the champion in the 1000m and 1500m at the 2nd stage of the Elite League of the China Cup in Short Track Speed Skating in the 2018–2019 season.

Zhang won the national championship in the 500m, women's relay and mixed relay. She also won the national short track final in the 1000 m and 1500 m. In the 2019–20 season, at the FIS World Cup in Salt Lake City, she won a bronze medal in the 1000 m, a gold medal in the relay, and a silver medal in the mixed relay. At the race in Montreal, Canada, she won gold medals in the women's and mixed relays. In February 2020, in Dordrecht, she won a silver medal in the 1000 m.

Zhang also participated in the 2020 Winter Youth Olympics in Lausanne and took 6th place in the 1000 m, 8th in the 500 m, and 5th in the mixed relay. In the 2021–22 season, at the World Cup in Debrecen, she finished in 3rd place in the women's relay and in Dordrecht, she also finished in 3rd in the mixed relay. In January 2022, Zhang qualified for the Olympics in Beijing.

In February 2022, at the 2022 Winter Olympics in Beijing, on 11 February, Zhang participated in the 1000 m race and finished in 15th place. Two days later, as part of the women's team, she won a bronze medal in the 3000 m relay. On 16 February, at the 1500 m event, she finished in 20th place.

Olympic Games
| Preceded by Gao Tingyu & Zhao Dan | Flagbearer for China (with Ning Zhongyan); Milano Cortina 2026 | Succeeded by Incumbent |
