= Park Ji-won (speed skater) =

South Korean short track speed skater

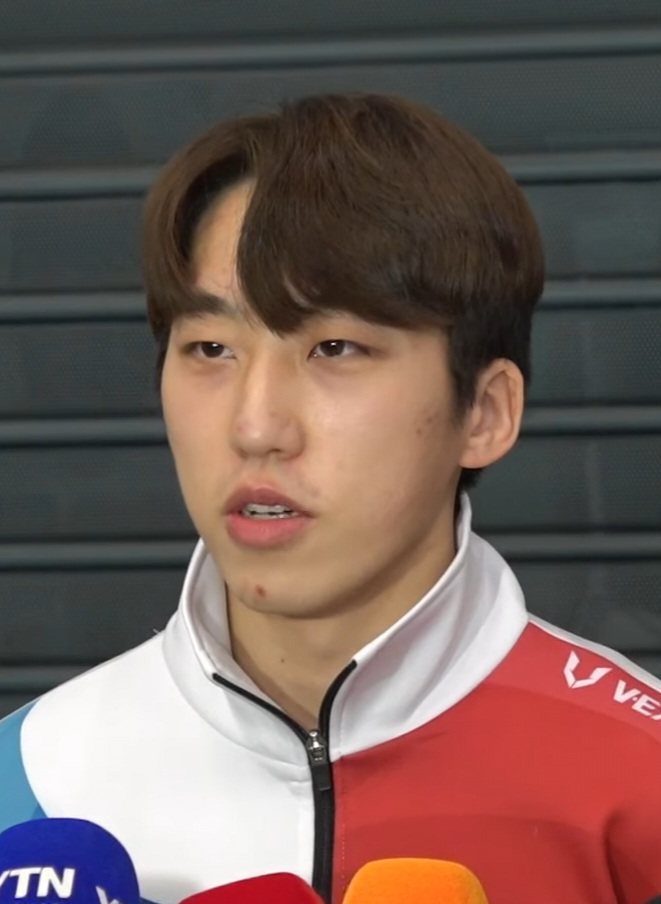

Personal information
- Nationality: South Korean
- Born: 23 September 1996 (age 30) Gangneung, South Korea

Sport
- Country: South Korea
- Sport: Short track speed skating
Medal record
Men's short-track speed skating
Representing South Korea
World Championships
Gold medal – first place	2019 Sofia	5000 m relay
Gold medal – first place	2023 Seoul	1000 m
Gold medal – first place	2023 Seoul	1500 m
Silver medal – second place	2024 Rotterdam	5000 m relay
Bronze medal – third place	2016 Seoul	5000 m relay
Bronze medal – third place	2023 Seoul	5000 m relay
Bronze medal – third place	2025 Beijing	5000 m relay
Asian Winter Games
Gold medal – first place	2025 Harbin	1500 m
Gold medal – first place	2025 Harbin	2000 m mixed relay
Silver medal – second place	2025 Harbin	500 m
Silver medal – second place	2025 Harbin	1000 m
Winter Universiade
Gold medal – first place	2017 Almaty	1500 m
Gold medal – first place	2019 Krasnoyarsk	500 m
Gold medal – first place	2019 Krasnoyarsk	5000 m relay
Silver medal – second place	2017 Almaty	1000 m
Bronze medal – third place	2019 Krasnoyarsk	1000 m

Park Ji-won (born 23 September 1996) is a South Korean short track speed skater.

== Career ==
He participated at the 2019 World Short Track Speed Skating Championships, winning a medal.

Park won the Crystal Globe for best overall skater of the World Tour in 2022-23 and 2023-24.
