= Gong Li (speed skater) =

Chinese speed skater (born 2000)

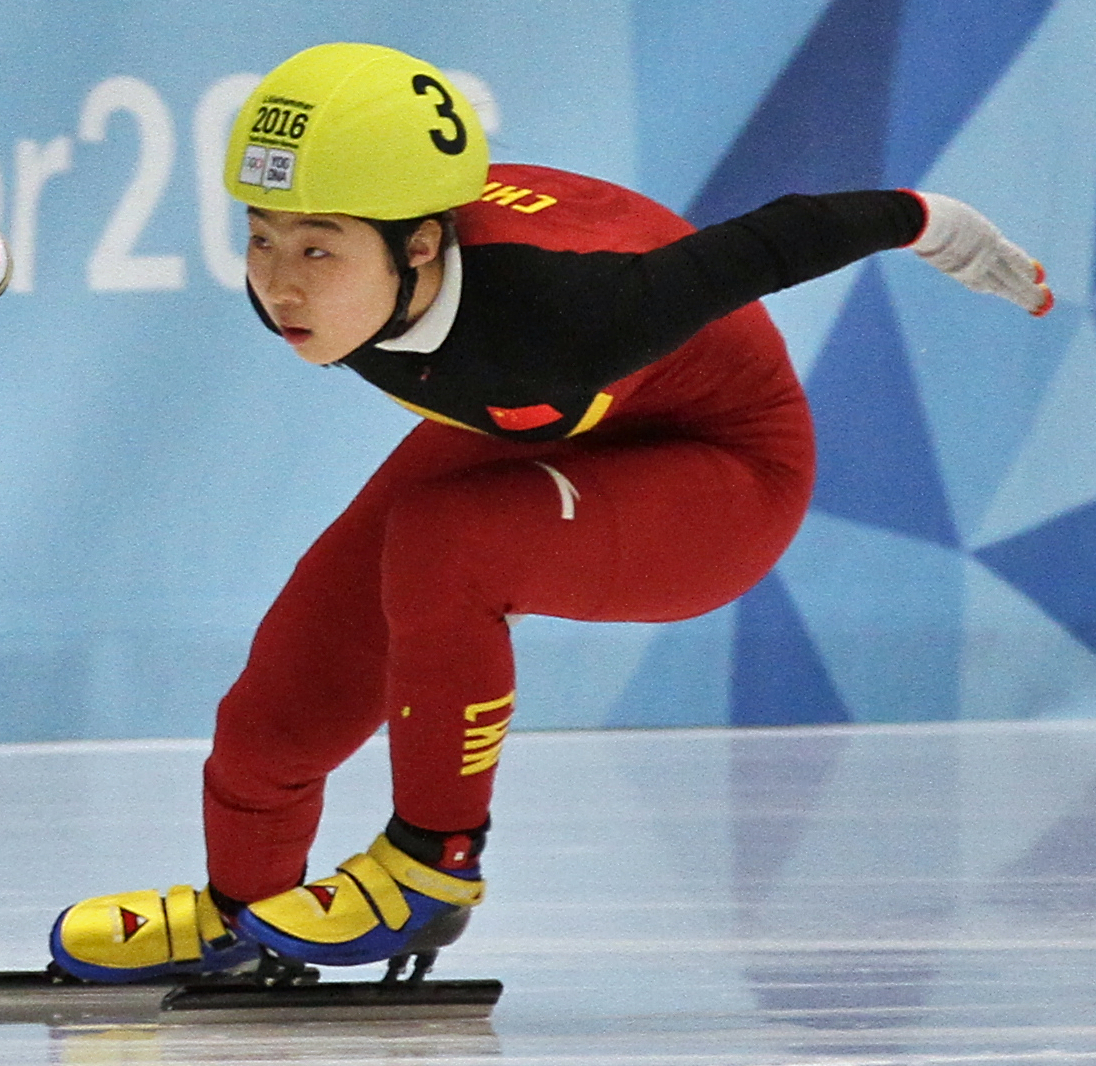
- Gong at the 2016 Winter Youth Olympics

Personal information
- Born: 9 July 2000 (age 25) Shandong, China
- Height: 1.67 m (5 ft 6 in)

Sport
- Country: China
- Sport: Short track speed skating
Medal record
Women's short-track speed skating
Representing China
World Championships
| Gold medal – first place | 2024 Rotterdam | 2000 m mixed relay |
| Silver medal – second place | 2023 Seoul | 2000 m mixed relay |
| Bronze medal – third place | 2026 Montreal | 3000 m relay |
Asian Games
| Gold medal – first place | 2025 Harbin | 3000 m relay |
| Silver medal – second place | 2025 Harbin | 1500 m |
Four Continents Championships
| Silver medal – second place | 2023 Salt Lake City | 2000 m mixed relay |

Gong Li (born 9 July 2000) is a Chinese short track speed-skater.

== Career ==
Gong competed at the 2023 World Short Track Speed Skating Championships and won a silver medal in the 2000 metre mixed relay, with a time of 2:41.821.

She represented China at the 2025 Asian Winter Games and won a gold medal in the 3000 metre relay with a time of 4:11.371. She also won a silver medal in the 1500 metres with a time of 2:23.884.

In January 2026, she was selected to represent China at the 2026 Winter Olympics.
