= Eklavya Jagal =

Short track speed skater from India

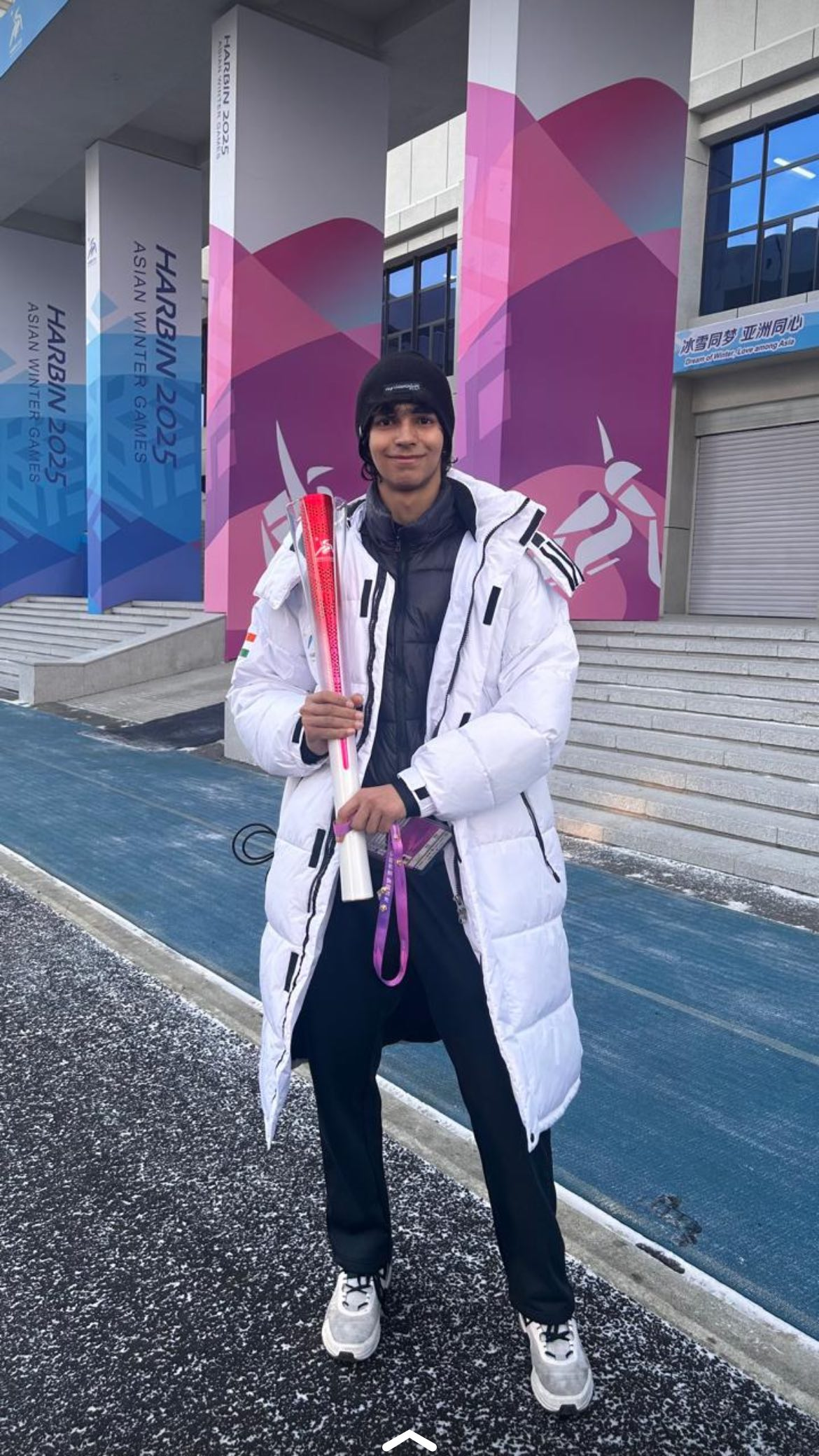
- Eklavya jagal : Short Track speed skater India

Personal information
- Nickname: Eki
- National team: Team India
- Born: 14 February 2007 (age 19) Mumbai - India
- Education: University of Utah
- Height: 193.04 cm (6 ft 4.00 in)
- Weight: 80 kg (176 lb; 12 st 8 lb)
- Other interests: Basketball & e-Sports

Sport
- Sport: Short Track Ice Skating
Medal record
Men's short track speed skating
Representing India
Asian Trophy 2025
Silver medal – second place	Asian Trophy 2025	5000 m
Bronze medal – third place	Asian Trophy 2025	500 m
Bronze medal – third place	Asian Trophy 2025	1000 m
Indonesia Open 2024
Gold medal – first place	Indonesia Open 2024 Jakarta	500 m
Gold medal – first place	Indonesia Open 2024 Jakarta	1000 m
Gold medal – first place	Indonesia Open 2024 Jakarta	1500 m
Jasz Cup
Bronze medal – third place	8th Jász Cup 2024 Hungary	500 m
3rd Khelo India Winter Games 2023
Gold medal – first place	3rd Khelo India Winter Games - Gulmarg	500 m
Gold medal – first place	3rd Khelo India Winter Games - Gulmarg	1000 m
4th Khelo India Winter Games 2024
Gold medal – first place	4th Khelo India Winter Games - Ladakh	500 m
- Updated on 29-08-2025

Eklavya Jagal (born 14 February 2007) is an Indian short track speed skater. He won 1 silver medal and 2 bronze medals in the Asian Trophy 2025. He also won three gold medals in Indonesia Open'24. He has also won two Khelo India Winter Games tournaments, the annual winter games of India.

== Biography ==
Jagal was born on 14 February 2007 in Mumbai, India. He began skating as an inline roller skater at the age of 10. Initially, he did part time short track ice skating at the 45 metre recreational ice skating rink iSkate situated at Gurugram Ambience mall in Gurugram. Eklavya has done his schooling from Amity International School Noida.

Eklavya has been the gold medals winner for the 5 consecutive years. He participated in the 3rd Khelo India Winter Games in February 2023, where he won two gold medals. He also won a gold medal at the 4th edition of the games.

Eklavya Jagal, won one silver Medal and two bronze medals at the Asian Open Short Track Trophy 2025. The event took place from August 20 to 23 at the Himadri Ice Skating Rink in Dehradun. The event featured skaters from 11 Asian countries competing fiercely across multiple distances.

He clinched silver in 5000 m relay race and bronze in both the 500m and 1000m races.

At the Indonesia Open Short Track Championship (Jakarta 2023), he won three gold medals in the 500m, 1000m and 1500m tournaments. He won a bronze medal at the 8th Jász Cup held in Hungary in January 2024 and earned a bronze medal in the 500 meters. In his debut at the 9th Asian Winter Games (Harbin, China – February 2025): games, Jagal achieved a 23rd rank in the 500 meters distance event.

== See also ==
- India at the 2025 Asian Winter Games
