= Abzal Azhgaliyev =

Kazakh speed skater (born 1992)

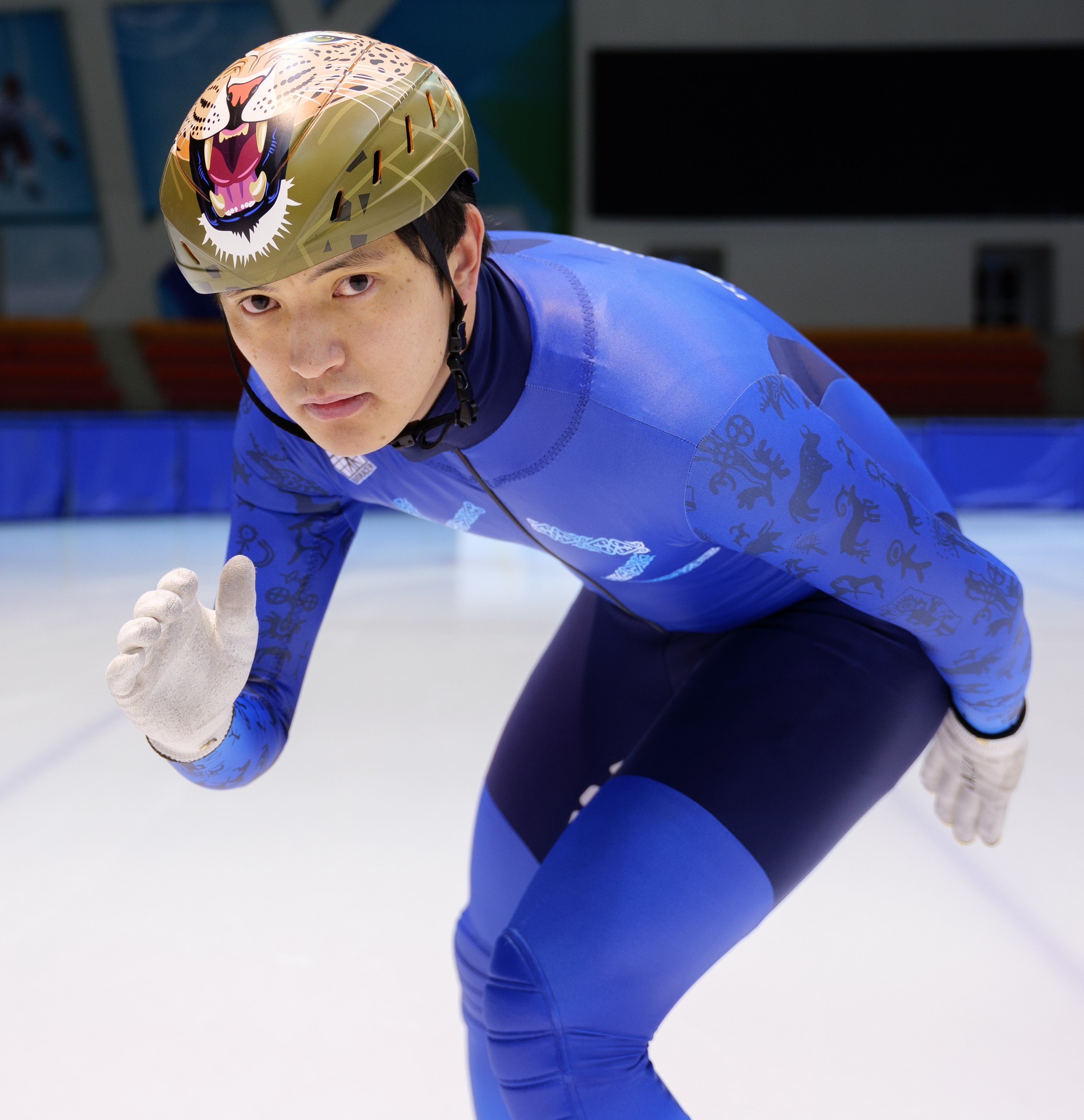
- Azhgaliyev in 2024

Personal information
- Born: 30 June 1992 (age 33) Oral, Kazakhstan
- Height: 1.74 m (5 ft 9 in)
- Weight: 70 kg (154 lb)

Sport
- Country: Kazakhstan
- Sport: Short track speed skating
- Coached by: Madygali Karsybekov, Zhaslan Mukhambetkaliyev
Medal record
Men's short track speed skating
Representing Kazakhstan
Asian Winter Games
Gold medal – first place	2025 Harbin	5000 m relay
Silver medal – second place	2025 Harbin	2000 m mixed relay
Bronze medal – third place	2011 Astana-Almaty	5000 m relay
Universiade
Silver medal – second place	2017 Almaty	500 m
Bronze medal – third place	2017 Almaty	5000 m relay

Abzal Abaiūly Äjğaliev (Note: Often transliterated as Abzal Abayevich Azhgaliyev through a Russified Romanization of Абзал Абаевич Ажгалиев.) (Kazakh: Абзал Абайұлы Ажғалиев; born 30 June 1992) is a Kazakh male short-track speed skater. He has competed in three Winter Olympic Games and is the first short-track skater from Kazakhstan to win a World Cup event. Holding eight World Cup podiums, he is the most decorated Kazakh skater.

== Early life ==
Azhgaliyev was born in 1992 in Uralsk, West Kazakhstan. He started skating at age nine when a recruiter came to his school and encouraged boys to try the sport. At age eleven he tried short track and loved the speed of it. He left secondary school and moved to a special school where he could focus on his training. He graduated from the Kazakh Academy of Sport and Tourism with a degree in sports education.

== Career ==
His coaches are Madygali Karsybekov, Zhasulan Mukhambetkaliev, and Pyotr Gamidov.

Azhgaliyev's first international competition was in Moscow in 2006. It hooked him on the sport.

In 2007, Azhgaliyev was designated Master of Sports of the Republic of Kazakhstan.

In 2011, Azhgaliyev was on the relay team that won the bronze medal in the Asian Games.

Azhgaliyev was the first Kazakh skater to win a World Cup event when he medaled in the 500m in 2016 in Salt Lake City, UT, United States. His time was 40.373 seconds. He received the title of Master of Sports of International Class of the Republic of Kazakhstan.

With state funding, Azhgaliyev and the other members of the national relay team trained in the Netherlands. However, he professed to prefer training in Kazakhstan, instead. He prefers to be with family. Now he trains in Nur-Sultan, where new facilities have been constructed. Russian skaters Semen Elistratov and Dmitry Migunov train in Nur-Sultan with the Kazakh team.

He has skated three times in the Winter Olympics.

His first winter games were in Sochi, Russia, in 2014, where he skated in the Men's 5000 Meters Relay. The team took fifth place.

He was the flagbearer in the 2018 Winter Olympics in Pyeongchang, Korea, where he was also the captain of the Kazakh National Olympic Team. He competed in the Men's 5000 Meters Relay.

In 2022, Azhgaliyev was once again the flagbearer for Kazakhstan. In Beijing, China, he competed in the 500m Men's event, as well as the Mixed Team Relay team with Adil Galiakhmetov, Denis Nikisha, Yana Khan, and Olga Tikhonova. Their relay team placed fifth.

His athletic heroes include Russia's Viktor An, Canadian Charles Hamelin, and China's Wang Meng.

== Personal life ==
He enjoys playing video games and watching soccer. His favorite teams are FC Akzhayik Uralsk and FC Barcelona. Before big races, he likes to have dinner with friends and family.

== Notes ==
Olympic Games
Preceded by Ruslan Zhaparov	Flagbearer for Kazakhstan; PyeongChang 2018	Succeeded by Himself
Preceded by Himself	Flagbearer for Kazakhstan; Beijing 2022	Succeeded by Denis Nikisha & Ayaulym Amrenova
