= Daniil Eybog =

Russian-Uzbek speed skater (born 1997)

Personal information
- Nationality: Russian; Uzbekistani
- Born: 20 March 1997 (age 29) Olenegorsk, Murmansk Oblast, Russia

Sport
- Country: Russia; Uzbekistan
- Sport: Speed skating
Medal record
Men's short-track speed skating
Representing Russia
European Championships
Gold medal – first place	2020 Debrecen	5000 m relay
Bronze medal – third place	2021 Gdańsk	5000 m relay
Military World Games
Gold medal – first place	2017 Sochi	3000 m mixed
World University Games
Silver medal – second place	2019 Krasnoyarsk	5000 m relay

Daniil Olegovich Eybog (born 20 March 1997) is a Russian and Uzbek short-track speed skater. He is a two-time European Championship medalist.

== Career ==
In 2015, Eybog received the title of Master of Sports of International Class. In 2017, he became the Russian champion in the 500-meter race. That same year, he competed in the Military World Games and won a gold medal in the 3000 m mixed event. In 2018, he won a silver medal in the Russian Championship in the 5000-meter relay. He then won a silver medal at the 2019 Universiade.

On 2 November 2019, Eybog won a gold medal as part of the Russian national team in the mixed relay at the first stage of the Short Track Speed Skating World Cup. The following day, in Salt Lake City, he won the men's 5000-meter relay.

In 2020, he won gold as part of the relay at the European Championships in Hungary. A year later, at the continental championships in Gdansk, he won bronze as part of the men's relay.

In February 2022, he competed in the Winter Olympics in the 1500 m event.

In 2024, Eybog changed his sporting nationality to the Uzbekistan national team with the condition of a two-year quarantine at international competitions.
