= Sidney Chu =

Hong Kong short track speed skater

Sidney K. Chu
Personal information
- Native name: 朱定文
- Born: Sidney K. Chu; 22 July 1999 (age 26) Hong Kong

Sport
- Sport: Short track speed skating

Sidney K. Chu (Chinese: 朱定文; born 22 July 1999 in Hong Kong) is a short track speed skater representing Hong Kong. Chu was Hong Kong's flag-bearer at the 2022 Winter Olympics in Beijing, China. Chu is currently the executive director of the Hong Kong Speed Skating Academy

== Career ==
In February 2022, Chu participated his first Olympic Games in Beijing, China. He ranked 24th out of 32 competitors in the men's 500m short track speed skating at that Olympics.
