= Sun Long (speed skater) =

Chinese speed skater (born 2000)

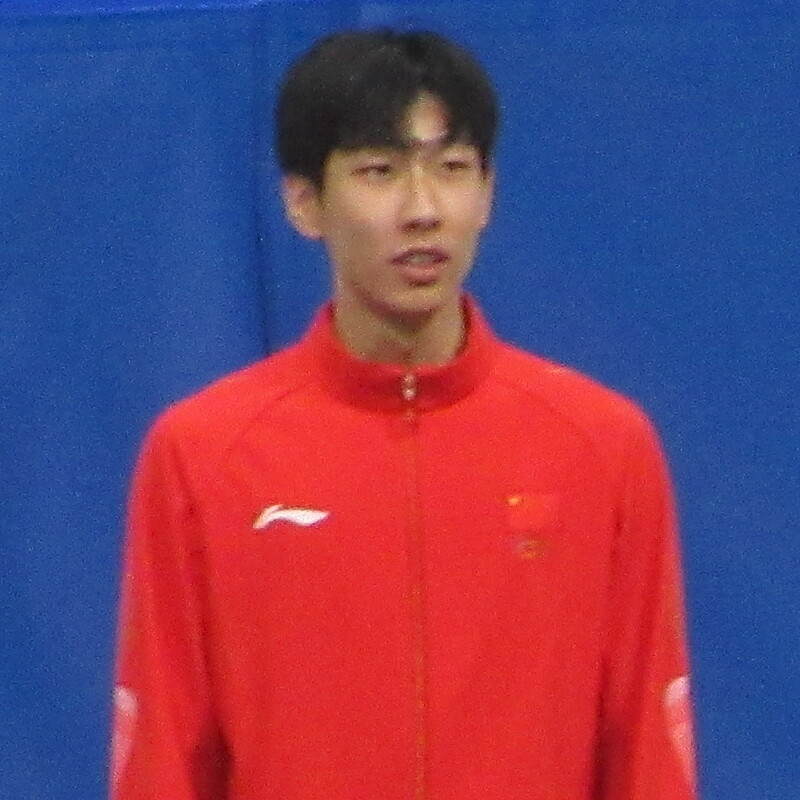
- Sun at the 2026 Winter Olympics

Personal information
- Nationality: Chinese
- Born: 28 August 2000 (age 26) Changchun, Jilin, China
- Height: 184 cm (6 ft 0 in)

Sport
- Country: China
- Sport: Short track speed skating
- Event: 500 m
- Coached by: Viktor An
Medal record
Men's short track speed skating
Representing China
Olympic Games
Silver medal – second place	2026 Milano Cortina	1000 m
World Championships
Gold medal – first place	2024 Rotterdam	1500 m
Gold medal – first place	2024 Rotterdam	5000 m relay
Gold medal – first place	2024 Rotterdam	2000 m mixed relay
Silver medal – second place	2019 Sofia	5000 m relay
Silver medal – second place	2025 Beijing	5000 m relay
Asian Games
Bronze medal – third place	2025 Harbin	5000 m relay
World Junior Championships
Gold medal – first place	2019 Montreal	3000 m relay
Gold medal – first place	2020 Bormio	1000 m
Silver medal – second place	2019 Montreal	500 m
Bronze medal – third place	2020 Bormio	500 m

Sun Long (born 28 August 2000) is a Chinese short track speed skater. He is a 2026 Winter Olympic silver medalist, five-time World medalist (including 3 gold in 2024), and a 2025 Asian Winter Games bronze medalist.

At the junior level, he is a four-time World Junior medalist (2 gold, 1 silver, 1 bronze).
