= Denis Nikisha =

Kazakhstani speed skater (born 1995)

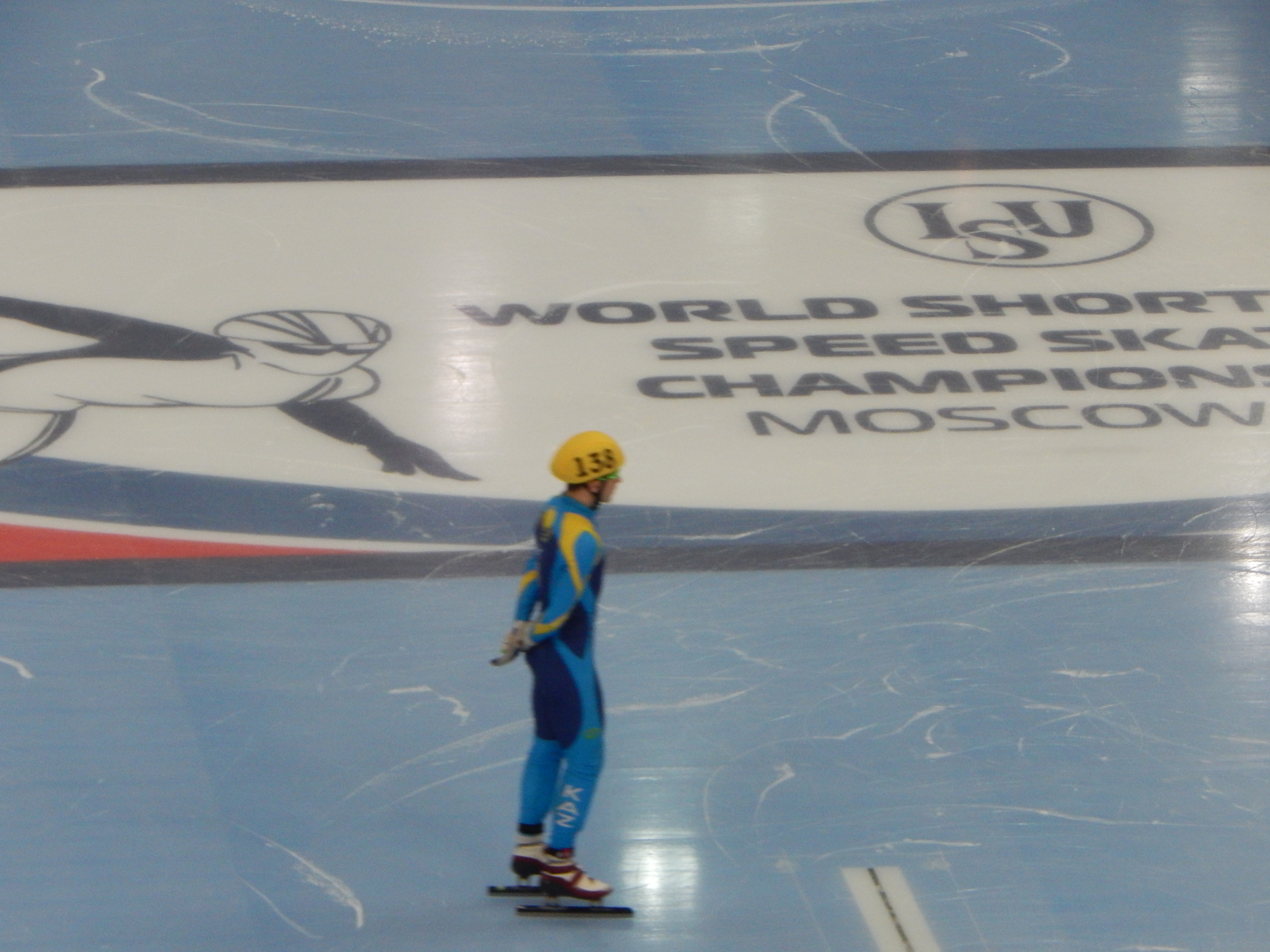
- Nikisha in 2015

Personal information
- Native name: Денис Андреевич Никиша
- Born: 7 August 1995 (age 30) Kostanay, Kazakhstan
- Height: 1.78 m (5 ft 10 in)
- Weight: 72 kg (159 lb)

Sport
- Country: Kazakhstan
- Sport: Short track speed skating
- Coached by: Petr Gamidov, Jimmy Jang, Xenia Sergeevna
Medal record
Representing Kazakhstan
World Championships
Silver medal – second place	2024 Rotterdam	500 m
Silver medal – second place	2025 Beijing	500 m
Asian Winter Games
Gold medal – first place	2025 Harbin	5000 m relay
Silver medal – second place	2025 Harbin	2000 m mixed relay
Winter Universiade
Bronze medal – third place	2017 Almaty	500 m
Bronze medal – third place	2017 Almaty	1000 m
Bronze medal – third place	2017 Almaty	5000 m relay
Bronze medal – third place	2019 Krasnoyarsk	5000 m relay

Denis Andreyevich Nikisha (Russian: Денис Андреевич Никиша; born 7 August 1995) is a Kazakh short track speed skater.
