= Thailand at the 2025 Asian Winter Games =

- Flag of Thailand
- IOC code: THA
- NOC: Thailand Olympic Committee

in Harbin, China 7 February 2025 – 14 February 2025
- Competitors: 85 in 11 sports
- Flag bearer: Thanatip Bunrit & Teekhree Silpa-Archa
- Medals Ranked =8th: Gold 0 Silver 0 Bronze 1 Total 1

Asian Winter Games appearances
- 1996; 1999; 2003; 2007; 2011; 2017; 2025; 2029

Thailand competed at the 2025 Asian Winter Games in Harbin, China, from February 7 to 14. The Thai delegation is scheduled to consist of 85 athletes. Cross-country skier Thanatip Bunrit and figure skater Teekhree Silpa-Archa were the country's opening ceremony flagbearers.

Thailand won its first Asian Winter Games medal; a bronze in freestyle skiing on February 11. It is also the first ever medal won for a Southeast Asian nation.

== Medal summary ==
Medalist

| Medal | Name | Sport | Event | Date |
|---|---|---|---|---|
| Bronze | Paul Vieuxtemps | Freestyle skiing | Men's slopestyle | 11 February |

== Competitors ==
The following table lists the Thai delegation per sport and gender.

| Sport | Men | Women | Total |
|---|---|---|---|
| Alpine skiing | 4 | 2 | 6 |
| Biathlon | 4 | 1 | 5 |
| Cross-country skiing | 6 | 2 | 8 |
| Curling | 6 | 6 | 12 |
| Figure skating | 0 | 2 | 2 |
| Freestyle skiing | 1 | 0 | 1 |
| Ice hockey | 22 | 22 | 44 |
| Short-track speed skating | 4 | 2 | 6 |
| Ski mountaineering | 1 | 0 | 1 |
| Snowboarding | 1 | 0 | 1 |
| Speed skating | 1 | 0 | 1 |
| Total | 48 | 37 | 85 |

- Two male athletes will compete in both biathlon and cross-country skiing.

== Alpine skiing ==
Thailand entered four male and two female alpine skiers.

| Athlete | Event | Run 1 | | Run 2 | | Total | |
| Athlete | Event | Time | Rank | Time | Rank | Time | Rank |
|---|---|---|---|---|---|---|---|
| Kornkan Khampuengson | Men's slalom | 57.23 | 30 | 56.77 | 26 | 1:54.00 | 27 |
| Pattarapol Saengdaeng | Men's slalom | 57.82 | 32 | 55.64 | 24 | 1:53.46 | 24 |
| Thotsawat Nokyaem | Men's slalom | DNF | | Did not advance | | | |
| Tommi Iimo Emil Aalto | Men's slalom | 54.01 | 23 | 55.52 | 22 | 1:49.53 | 22 |
| Karyssa Vasavanont | Women's slalom | 1:05.36 | 25 | 1:01.75 | 19 | 2:07.11 | 20 |
| Phichayaporn Thipkesorn | Women's slalom | 1:08.64 | 29 | 1:06.11 | 25 | 2:14.75 | 24 |

== Biathlon ==
Thailand entered four male and one female biathletes.

Men

| Athlete | Event | Time | Misses | Rank |
|---|---|---|---|---|
| Kitsakorn Kingsakul | Sprint | 50:10.6 | 5+5 | 30 |
| Mark Chanloung | Sprint | 35:57.8 | 4+5 | 20 |
| Naravich Saisuk | Sprint | DNF | | |
| Thanakorn Ngoeichai | Sprint | 36:57.2 | 0+3 | 22 |
| Kitsakorn Kingsakul; Mark Chanloung; Naravich Saisuk; Thanakorn Ngoeichai | Relay | 2:00:32.1 | 22+24 | 7 |

Women

| Athlete | Event | Time | Misses | Rank |
|---|---|---|---|---|
| Jariyawadee Audomlap | Sprint | 35:00.7 | 4+1 | 21 |

== Cross-country skiing ==
Thailand entered six male and two female cross-country skiers.

Men's distance

| Athlete | Event | Total | |
| Athlete | Event | Time | Rank |
|---|---|---|---|
| Athit Nitisapon | 10 km freestyle | 28:36.1 | 36 |
| Jakawan Charoensook | 10 km freestyle | 28:51.1 | 37 |
| Jittipat Chitmunchaitham | 10 km freestyle | 28:13.2 | 34 |
| Thanatip Bunrit | 10 km freestyle | 26:23.7 | 28 |
| Athit Nitisapon; Jakawan Charoensook; Jittipat Chitmunchaitham; Thanatip Bunrit | 4 × 7.5 km relay | 1:31:24.0 | 8 |

Women's distance

| Athlete | Event | Total | |
| Athlete | Event | Time | Rank |
|---|---|---|---|
| Natthaatcha Chatthitimetee | 5 km freestyle | 18:57.4 | 29 |
| Phatcharapha Sangchan | 5 km freestyle | 18:20.2 | 27 |

Men's sprint

| Athlete | Event | Qualification | | Quarterfinal | | Semifinal | | Final | |
| Athlete | Event | Time | Rank | Time | Rank | Time | Rank | Time | Rank |
|---|---|---|---|---|---|---|---|---|---|
| Jittipat Chitmunchaitham | Sprint classical | 4:06.07 | 32 | Did not advance | | | | | 32 |
| Mark Chanloung | Sprint classical | 3:18.42 | 17 | 3:06.61 | 3 LL | 3:11.32 | 6 | Did not advance | 11 |
| Thanakorn Ngoeichai | Sprint classical | 3:34.11 | 22 | 3:33.82 | 5 | Did not advance | | | 21 |
| Thanatip Bunrit | Sprint classical | 3:50.53 | 26 | 3:41.67 | 5 | Did not advance | | | 22 |

Qualification legend: LL - Qualify as lucky loser

Women's sprint

| Athlete | Event | Qualification | | Quarterfinal | | Semifinal | | Final | |
| Athlete | Event | Time | Rank | Time | Rank | Time | Rank | Time | Rank |
|---|---|---|---|---|---|---|---|---|---|
| Natthaatcha Chatthitimetee | Sprint classical | 5:17.59 | 23 | 5:51.53 | 5 | Did not advance | | | 22 |
| Phatcharapha Sangchan | Sprint classical | 5:37.36 | 25 | 5:14.05 | 5 | Did not advance | | | 24 |

== Curling ==
Thailand made their Asian Winter Games debut in this edition of the continental tournament.

Summary

| Team | Event | Group stage | | | | | | | | | Qualification | Semifinal | Final / BM | |
| Team | Event | Opposition Score | Opposition Score | Opposition Score | Opposition Score | Opposition Score | Opposition Score | Opposition Score | Opposition Score | Rank | Opposition Score | Opposition Score | Opposition Score | Rank |
|---|---|---|---|---|---|---|---|---|---|---|---|---|---|---|
| Thailand men | Men's tournament | Japan; L 0–23 | Hong Kong; L 1–16 | Saudi Arabia; L 2–12 | China; L 1–16 | Qatar; L 4–6 | — | | | 6 | Did not advance | | | 11 |
| Thailand women | Women's tournament | China; L 1–19 | Hong Kong; L 3–9 | South Korea; L 0–14 | Chinese Taipei; L 2–10 | Japan; L 2–13 | Philippines; L 0–16 | Qatar; W 10–1 | Kazakhstan; L 1–9 | 8 | Did not advance | | | 8 |
| Thailand mixed | Mixed doubles | Japan; L 2–12 | Kuwait; W 12–3 | Mongolia; W 10–5 | Hong Kong; L 5–14 | Chinese Taipei; L 0–12 | — | | | 4 | Did not advance | | | 8 |

=== Men's tournament ===
Thailand entered a men's curling team (five male curlers).

Team roster
Skip: Pongsak Mahattanasakul
Third: Nuth Boonyaporn
Second: Thepparit Riwin
Lead: Aongart Maneenet
Alternate: Prawes Kaewjeen

Round robin

| Group B | Skip | W | L | W–L | PF | PA | EW | EL | BE | SE | DSC |
|---|---|---|---|---|---|---|---|---|---|---|---|
| China | Xu Xiaoming | 5 | 0 | – | 53 | 10 | 23 | 8 | 0 | 13 | 36.46 |
| Hong Kong | Jason Chang | 4 | 1 | – | 50 | 16 | 21 | 9 | 1 | 14 | 62.23 |
| Japan | Ryo Aoki | 3 | 2 | – | 52 | 21 | 19 | 13 | 3 | 7 | 63.73 |
| Qatar | Mubarak Al-Marri | 2 | 3 | – | 21 | 41 | 14 | 19 | 0 | 5 | 138.50 |
| Saudi Arabia | Suleiman Alaqel | 1 | 4 | – | 22 | 55 | 12 | 21 | 0 | 3 | 128.47 |
| Thailand | Pongsak Mahattanasakul | 0 | 5 | – | 8 | 73 | 7 | 26 | 0 | 1 | 130.14 |

Draw 1

Sunday, 9 February, 13:00

| Sheet B | 1 | 2 | 3 | 4 | 5 | 6 | 7 | 8 | Final |
| Thailand (Mahattanasakul) | 0 | 0 | 0 | 0 | 0 | 0 | X | X | 0 |
| Japan (Aoki) | 3 | 5 | 3 | 4 | 3 | 5 | X | X | 23 |

Draw 2

Sunday, 9 February, 21:00

| Sheet E | 1 | 2 | 3 | 4 | 5 | 6 | 7 | 8 | Final |
| Thailand (Mahattanasakul) | 0 | 0 | 0 | 0 | 0 | 1 | X | X | 1 |
| Hong Kong (Chang) | 4 | 3 | 1 | 3 | 5 | 0 | X | X | 16 |

Draw 4

Monday, 10 February, 14:00

| Sheet C | 1 | 2 | 3 | 4 | 5 | 6 | 7 | 8 | Final |
| Thailand (Mahattanasakul) | 0 | 1 | 0 | 0 | 0 | 1 | 0 | X | 2 |
| Saudi Arabia (Alaqel) | 2 | 0 | 4 | 2 | 2 | 0 | 2 | X | 12 |

Draw 6

Tuesday, 11 February, 14:00

| Sheet D | 1 | 2 | 3 | 4 | 5 | 6 | 7 | 8 | Final |
| China (Xu) | 5 | 2 | 3 | 1 | 5 | 0 | X | X | 16 |
| Thailand (Mahattanasakul) | 0 | 0 | 0 | 0 | 0 | 1 | X | X | 1 |

Draw 8

Wednesday, 12 February, 14:00

| Sheet A | 1 | 2 | 3 | 4 | 5 | 6 | 7 | 8 | Final |
| Qatar (Al-Marri) | 1 | 1 | 0 | 1 | 0 | 0 | 1 | 2 | 6 |
| Thailand (Mahattanasakul) | 0 | 0 | 1 | 0 | 2 | 1 | 0 | 0 | 4 |

=== Women's tournament ===
Thailand entered a women's curling team (five female curlers).

Team roster
Skip: Kanya Natchanarong
Third: Supakan Kaewmorakot
Second: Nattida Kumpeerakit
Lead: Wanvisa Punyaneramitdee
Alternate: Phichayathida Jaosap

Round robin

| Team | Skip | W | L | W–L | PF | PA | EW | EL | BE | SE | DSC |
|---|---|---|---|---|---|---|---|---|---|---|---|
| South Korea | Gim Eun-ji | 8 | 0 | – | 63 | 14 | 33 | 11 | 0 | 18 | 45.90 |
| China | Wang Rui | 7 | 1 | – | 85 | 21 | 34 | 17 | 3 | 18 | 38.69 |
| Japan | Yuina Miura | 6 | 2 | – | 68 | 30 | 32 | 19 | 2 | 14 | 58.25 |
| Kazakhstan | Angelina Ebauyer | 5 | 3 | – | 55 | 39 | 28 | 22 | 1 | 14 | 54.81 |
| Philippines | Kathleen Dubberstein | 4 | 4 | – | 61 | 36 | 32 | 21 | 1 | 16 | 85.56 |
| Hong Kong | Ling-Yue Hung | 3 | 5 | – | 44 | 45 | 24 | 29 | 1 | 11 | 115.69 |
| Chinese Taipei | Yang Ko | 2 | 6 | – | 29 | 75 | 16 | 34 | 1 | 4 | 107.27 |
| Thailand | Kanya Natchanarong | 1 | 7 | – | 19 | 91 | 15 | 30 | 0 | 7 | 128.48 |
| Qatar | Sara Al-Qaet | 0 | 8 | – | 11 | 84 | 8 | 33 | 1 | 5 | 180.65 |

Draw 1

Sunday, 9 February, 9:00

| Sheet C | 1 | 2 | 3 | 4 | 5 | 6 | 7 | 8 | Final |
| China (Wang) | 3 | 7 | 5 | 2 | 2 | 0 | X | X | 19 |
| Thailand (Natchanarong) | 0 | 0 | 0 | 0 | 0 | 1 | X | X | 1 |

Draw 2

Sunday, 9 February, 17:00

| Sheet A | 1 | 2 | 3 | 4 | 5 | 6 | 7 | 8 | Final |
| Thailand (Natchanarong) | 1 | 0 | 0 | 1 | 0 | 1 | 0 | X | 3 |
| Hong Kong (Hung) | 0 | 1 | 3 | 0 | 3 | 0 | 2 | X | 9 |

Draw 3

Monday, 10 February, 9:00

| Sheet E | 1 | 2 | 3 | 4 | 5 | 6 | 7 | 8 | Final |
| Thailand (Natchanarong) | 0 | 0 | 0 | 0 | 0 | 0 | X | X | 0 |
| South Korea (Gim) | 5 | 2 | 2 | 2 | 2 | 1 | X | X | 14 |

Draw 4

Monday, 10 February, 19:00

| Sheet B | 1 | 2 | 3 | 4 | 5 | 6 | 7 | 8 | Final |
| Chinese Taipei (Yang) | 3 | 0 | 2 | 0 | 1 | 1 | 3 | X | 10 |
| Thailand (Natchanarong) | 0 | 1 | 0 | 1 | 0 | 0 | 0 | X | 2 |

Draw 5

Tuesday, 11 February, 9:00

| Sheet C | 1 | 2 | 3 | 4 | 5 | 6 | 7 | 8 | Final |
| Thailand (Natchanarong) | 0 | 1 | 0 | 0 | 1 | 0 | X | X | 2 |
| Japan (Miura) | 4 | 0 | 2 | 4 | 0 | 3 | X | X | 13 |

Draw 6

Tuesday, 11 February, 19:00

| Sheet D | 1 | 2 | 3 | 4 | 5 | 6 | 7 | 8 | Final |
| Philippines (Dubberstein) | 1 | 2 | 5 | 2 | 1 | 5 | X | X | 16 |
| Thailand (Natchanarong) | 0 | 0 | 0 | 0 | 0 | 0 | X | X | 0 |

Draw 7

Wednesday, 12 February, 9:00

| Sheet B | 1 | 2 | 3 | 4 | 5 | 6 | 7 | 8 | Final |
| Thailand (Natchanarong) | 0 | 1 | 1 | 1 | 1 | 4 | 2 | X | 10 |
| Qatar (Al-Qaet) | 1 | 0 | 0 | 0 | 0 | 0 | 0 | X | 1 |

Draw 8

Wednesday, 12 February, 19:00

| Sheet E | 1 | 2 | 3 | 4 | 5 | 6 | 7 | 8 | Final |
| Kazakhstan (Ebauyer) | 0 | 2 | 1 | 1 | 3 | 2 | X | X | 9 |
| Thailand (Natchanarong) | 1 | 0 | 0 | 0 | 0 | 0 | X | X | 1 |

=== Mixed doubles tournament ===
Thailand entered a mixed doubles curling pair (one male and one female curlers).

Pair roster
Skip: Chanatip Sonkham
Third: Teekawin Jearateerawit

Round robin

| Group A | Athletes | W | L | W–L | PF | PA | EW | EL | BE | SE | DSC |
|---|---|---|---|---|---|---|---|---|---|---|---|
| Japan | Tori Koana / Go Aoki | 5 | 0 | – | 49 | 8 | 21 | 5 | 0 | 15 | 57.23 |
| Hong Kong | Ling-Yue Hung / Martin Yan | 4 | 1 | – | 46 | 26 | 19 | 17 | 0 | 8 | 56.68 |
| Chinese Taipei | Chou Yi-hsuan / Liu Bor-kai | 3 | 2 | – | 44 | 25 | 20 | 14 | 0 | 9 | 65.56 |
| Thailand | Chanatip Sonkham / Teekawin Jearateerawit | 2 | 3 | – | 29 | 46 | 14 | 20 | 0 | 7 | 142.12 |
| Kuwait | Fatema Abdulateef / Saud Alkandari | 1 | 4 | – | 14 | 41 | 12 | 17 | 0 | 4 | 197.23 |
| Mongolia | Enkhzaya Ganbat / Bayar Bulgankhuu | 0 | 5 | – | 16 | 52 | 11 | 24 | 0 | 2 | 134.74 |

Draw 1

Tuesday, 4 February, 10:00

| Sheet E | 1 | 2 | 3 | 4 | 5 | 6 | 7 | 8 | Final |
| Japan (Koana / Aoki) | 0 | 3 | 2 | 2 | 0 | 3 | 2 | X | 12 |
| Thailand (Sonkham / Jearateerawit) | 1 | 0 | 0 | 0 | 1 | 0 | 0 | X | 2 |

Draw 2

Tuesday, 4 February, 14:00

| Sheet B | 1 | 2 | 3 | 4 | 5 | 6 | 7 | 8 | Final |
| Thailand (Sonkham / Jearateerawit) | 0 | 1 | 4 | 1 | 0 | 4 | 2 | X | 12 |
| Kuwait (Abdulateef / Alkandari) | 1 | 0 | 0 | 0 | 2 | 0 | 0 | X | 3 |

Draw 5

Wednesday, 5 February, 18:00

| Sheet C | 1 | 2 | 3 | 4 | 5 | 6 | 7 | 8 | Final |
| Mongolia (Ganbat / Bulgankhuu) | 1 | 0 | 2 | 0 | 0 | 2 | 0 | X | 5 |
| Thailand (Sonkham / Jearateerawit) | 0 | 3 | 0 | 2 | 1 | 0 | 4 | X | 10 |

Draw 7

Thursday, 6 February, 14:00

| Sheet A | 1 | 2 | 3 | 4 | 5 | 6 | 7 | 8 | Final |
| Thailand (Sonkham / Jearateerawit) | 1 | 0 | 1 | 3 | 0 | 0 | 0 | X | 5 |
| Hong Kong (Hung / Yan) | 0 | 4 | 0 | 0 | 5 | 2 | 3 | X | 14 |

Draw 8

Thursday, 6 February, 18:00

| Sheet D | 1 | 2 | 3 | 4 | 5 | 6 | 7 | 8 | Final |
| Chinese Taipei (Chou / Liu) | 1 | 2 | 4 | 2 | 1 | 2 | X | X | 12 |
| Thailand (Sonkham / Jearateerawit) | 0 | 0 | 0 | 0 | 0 | 0 | X | X | 0 |

== Figure skating ==
Thailand entered two female figure skaters.

Individual

| Athlete | Event | SP | | FS | | Total | |
| Athlete | Event | Points | Rank | Points | Rank | Points | Rank |
|---|---|---|---|---|---|---|---|
| Teekhree Silpa-Archa | Women's singles | 25.15 | 20 | 44.95 | 22 | 70.10 | 21 |
| Vipanun Hetrakul | Women's singles | 22.17 | 22 | 39.99 | 23 | 62.16 | 23 |

== Freestyle skiing ==
Thailand entered one male freestyle skier.

Men

| Athlete | Event | Final | | | | |
| Athlete | Event | Run 1 | Run 2 | Run 3 | Best | Rank |
|---|---|---|---|---|---|---|
| Paul Vieuxtemps | Big air | 69.25 | 48.25 | 64.50 | 133.75 | 6 |
| Paul Vieuxtemps | Slopestyle | 59.75 | DNI | 85.25 | 85.25 | 3rd place, bronze medalist(s) |

== Ice hockey ==
Summary
Men

| Team | Event | Group stage | | | | | | Playoff | Quarterfinal | Semifinal | Final / BM | |
| Team | Event | Opposition Result | Opposition Result | Opposition Result | Opposition Result | Opposition Result | Rank | Opposition Result | Opposition Result | Opposition Result | Opposition Result | Rank |
|---|---|---|---|---|---|---|---|---|---|---|---|---|
| Thailand men | Men's tournament | Kazakhstan; L 0–12 | Japan; L 1–8 | China; L 0–8 | South Korea; L 0–10 | Chinese Taipei; L 1–3 | 6 Q | Bye | Japan; L 2–15 | — | | 6 |

Women

| Team | Event | Preliminary round | | | | Final round | | | | |
| Team | Event | Opposition Result | Opposition Result | Opposition Result | Opposition Result | Rank | Opposition Result | Opposition Result | Opposition Result | Rank |
|---|---|---|---|---|---|---|---|---|---|---|
| Thailand women | Women's tournament | Chinese Taipei; L 1–4 | Kazakhstan; L 0–9 | South Korea; L 0–11 | Hong Kong; W 2–1 | 4 | Did not advance | | | 6 |

=== Men's tournament ===
Thailand qualified a men's hockey team after being ranked as one of the top 12 teams in Asia on the IIHF World Ranking as of May 2024.

Team roster

The following is the Thai roster in the men's ice hockey tournament (22 male ice hockey players).

Head coach: (Canada) Casey Cook

| No. | Pos. | Name | Height | Weight | Birthdate | Team |
|---|---|---|---|---|---|---|
| 1 | G | Benjamin Kleineschay | 6 ft 0 in (183 cm) | 209 lb (95 kg) | October 6, 1999 (aged 25) | (Thailand) Ice Breakers |
| 4 | F | Rakchai Sukwiboon | 5 ft 5 in (165 cm) | 165 lb (75 kg) | September 30, 1996 (aged 28) | (Thailand) Panthers |
| 5 | D | Ken Kindborn | 5 ft 11 in (180 cm) | 183 lb (83 kg) | November 10, 1995 (aged 29) | (Thailand) IHAT |
| 6 | F | Nakrit Sutivijitho | 5 ft 9 in (175 cm) | 176 lb (80 kg) | August 29, 2005 (aged 19) | (Thailand) Bangkok Warriors |
| 7 | F | Pann Hongswadhi | 5 ft 6 in (168 cm) | 132 lb (60 kg) | July 28, 2002 (aged 22) | (Thailand) Canstar Rangers |
| 8 | D | Punn Phasukkijwatana | 5 ft 10 in (178 cm) | 176 lb (80 kg) | May 11, 2003 (aged 21) | (Thailand) Chiangmai |
| 10 | F | Athit Khunraj | 6 ft 1 in (185 cm) | 187 lb (85 kg) | July 15, 2005 (aged 19) | (Thailand) Southern Wolf |
| 11 | F | Patrick Forstner | 6 ft 1 in (185 cm) | 176 lb (80 kg) | February 21, 1993 (aged 31) | (Thailand) Bangkok Warriors |
| 12 | D | Sarawut Watthana | 5 ft 10 in (178 cm) | 214 lb (97 kg) | December 28, 1996 (aged 28) | (Thailand) Bangkok Warriors |
| 13 | F | Nicholas Charles Lampson | 5 ft 10 in (178 cm) | 172 lb (78 kg) | March 24, 1998 (aged 26) | (Thailand) IHAT |
| 14 | D | Sarawut Phasookwong | 6 ft 0 in (183 cm) | 168 lb (76 kg) | April 5, 1997 (aged 27) | (Thailand) Bangkok Warriors |
| 15 | F | Thanachai Sakchaicharoenkul | 5 ft 10 in (178 cm) | 148 lb (67 kg) | June 26, 2004 (aged 20) | (Thailand) Canstar Rangers |
| 16 | D | Araya Vatanapanyakul | 5 ft 8 in (173 cm) | 176 lb (80 kg) | June 5, 1999 (aged 25) | (Thailand) Ice Breakers |
| 17 | F | Nathaphat Luckanatinakorn | 5 ft 7 in (170 cm) | 154 lb (70 kg) | October 14, 2002 (aged 22) | (Thailand) 25G |
| 18 | F | Chanokchon Limpinphet | 5 ft 10 in (178 cm) | 154 lb (70 kg) | March 26, 1999 (aged 25) | (Thailand) Ice Breakers |
| 19 | F | Thatsanai Phuangrot | 5 ft 9 in (175 cm) | 143 lb (65 kg) | July 26, 1997 (aged 27) | (Thailand) Bangkok Warriors |
| 20 | G | Dominik Vollenweider | 5 ft 10 in (178 cm) | 198 lb (90 kg) | July 30, 1999 (aged 25) | (Thailand) Chiangmai |
| 22 | D | Natchayatorn Yannakornthanapunt | 6 ft 0 in (183 cm) | 143 lb (65 kg) | November 5, 2007 (aged 17) | (Thailand) Bangkok Warriors |
| 24 | D | Satira Tawon | 6 ft 1 in (185 cm) | 212 lb (96 kg) | October 10, 1998 (aged 26) | (Thailand) Bangkok Warriors |
| 25 | G | Jimmy McAlear Na Phikul | 5 ft 9 in (175 cm) | 126 lb (57 kg) | February 9, 2005 (aged 19) | (Thailand) IHAT |
| 28 | F | Kim Aarola | 5 ft 10 in (178 cm) | 172 lb (78 kg) | January 25, 1993 (aged 32) | (Finland) Hyvinkään Jää-Ahmat |
| 68 | F | Jan Isaksson | 5 ft 9 in (175 cm) | 165 lb (75 kg) | November 9, 1995 (aged 29) | (Thailand) Bangkok Warriors |

Group stage

| Pos | Team | Pld | W | OW | OL | L | GF | GA | GD | Pts | Qualification |
|---|---|---|---|---|---|---|---|---|---|---|---|
| 1 | Kazakhstan | 5 | 5 | 0 | 0 | 0 | 41 | 3 | +38 | 15 | Quarterfinals |
| 2 | South Korea | 5 | 3 | 1 | 0 | 1 | 36 | 10 | +26 | 11 | Quarterfinals |
| 3 | Japan | 5 | 3 | 0 | 0 | 2 | 28 | 11 | +17 | 9 | Quarterfinals |
| 4 | China | 5 | 2 | 0 | 1 | 2 | 20 | 14 | +6 | 7 | Quarterfinals |
| 5 | Chinese Taipei | 5 | 1 | 0 | 0 | 4 | 4 | 52 | −48 | 3 | Quarterfinals |
| 6 | Thailand | 5 | 0 | 0 | 0 | 5 | 2 | 41 | −39 | 0 | Quarterfinals |

Source: OCA

| 4 February; 16:00 | Thailand | 0–12 (0–4, 0–2, 0–6) | Kazakhstan | Harbin Ice Hockey Arena, Harbin; Attendance: 1,634 |

Game reference

Ben Kleineschay
Goalies
Andrey Shutov
Referees:
Kang Tae-woo (KOR)
Liu Jiaqi (CHN)

| 0–1 | 10:58 – Kolesnikov (Buyalskiy, Likhotnikov) |
| 0–2 | 11:33 – Starchenko (Rymarev, Omirbekov) |
| 0–3 | 13:04 – Ospanov (Korolyov) |
| 0–4 | 13:25 – Stepanenko (Kolesnikov, Likhotnikov) |
| 0–5 | 33:12 – Omirbekov (Beketayev, Daniyar) |
| 0–6 | 36:04 – Beketayev (Daniyar, Starchenko) |
| 0–7 | 40:27 – Rymarev (Panyukov, Omirbekov) (PP) |
| 0–8 | 44:53 – Buyalskiy (Stepanenko, Likhotnikov) |
| 0–9 | 46:51 – Likhotnikov (Savitskiy, Beketayev) (SH) |
| 0–10 | 49:25 – Beketayev (Starchenko, Daniyar) |
| 0–11 | 54:31 – Gaitamirov (Panyukov, Breus) |
| 0–12 | 59:15 – Likhotnikov (Stepanenko, Buyalskiy) |

4 min
Penalties
2 min
4
Shots
66

| 5 February; 12:00 | Japan | 8–1 (1–0, 4–0, 3–1) | Thailand | Harbin Ice Hockey Arena, Harbin; Attendance: 715 |

Game reference

Issa Otsuka
Goalies
Dominik Vollenweider
Referees:
Shen Yen-chin (TPE)
Wang Gongbo (CHN)

| Isogai (Lawlor, Irikura) – 09:21 | 1–0 |
| Yoneyama (Hitosato, Isogai) (PP) – 25:29 | 2–0 |
| Yamada (Osawa, Lawlor) (SH) – 27:00 | 3–0 |
| Furuhashi (Kobayashi) – 39:05 | 4–0 |
| Takagi (Halliday, H. Sato) – 39:43 | 5–0 |
| Yamada (Isogai, Irikura) – 44:17 | 6–0 |
| Suzuki (Isogai, H. Sato) – 50:06 | 7–0 |
| | 7–1 | 54:15 – Aarola (PP) |
| Okubo (K. Otsu, Halliday) – 54:33 | 8–1 |

8 min
Penalties
6 min
76
Shots
13

| 7 February; 12:30 | Thailand | 0–8 (0–3, 0–3, 0–2) | China | Harbin Ice Hockey Arena, Harbin; Attendance: 3,060 |

Game reference

Ben Kleineschay
Goalies
Chen Shifeng
Referees:
Kang Tae-woo (KOR)
Timur Morev (KAZ)

| 0–1 | 06:50 – Yan (Guo, Zhang Z.) |
| 0–2 | 09:52 – Yu J. (Li M., Zuo) |
| 0–3 | 14:50 – Yan (Hou) (SH) |
| 0–4 | 28:06 – Zhang P. (Hou, Wang) (PP) |
| 0–5 | 29:44 – Zhang Z. (Guo, Zhang P.) |
| 0–6 | 30:41 – Wang (Hou, Zheng) |
| 0–7 | 52:07 – Wang |
| 0–8 | 56:51 – Yan (Zhang P., Zhang Z.) |

10 min
Penalties
10 min
17
Shots
49

| 8 February; 16:00 | Thailand | 0–10 (0–5, 0–1, 0–4) | South Korea | Harbin Ice Hockey Arena, Harbin; Attendance: 1,821 |

Game reference

Dominik Vollenweider
Goalies
Ha Jung-ho
Referees:
Li Ho Ching (HKG)
Shen Yen-chin (TPE)

| 0–1 | 03:25 – Kim S.Y. (Lim, Lee M.J.) |
| 0–2 | 05:57 – Kim S.W. (Lee C., Lim) |
| 0–3 | 08:56 – Jeon (Kwon, Nam) |
| 0–4 | 12:02 – Lee H. (Lee M.J., Kang Y.) |
| 0–5 | 16:43 – Kang M. (Kim S.Y., Kim S.H.) |
| 0–6 | 35:51 – Lee C. (Kim S.W., Ahn) |
| 0–7 | 42:45 – Kim S.W. (Kim W., Lee C.) |
| 0–8 | 52:49 – Kim S.Y. (Kong, Kang M.) |
| 0–9 | 55:01 – Ahn (Kim S.W., Oh) |
| 0–10 | 57:10 – Lee C. (Nam, Kim S.W.) (PP) |

4 min
Penalties
0 min
5
Shots
84

| 10 February; 16:00 | Chinese Taipei | 3–1 (0–0, 2–0, 1–1) | Thailand | Harbin Ice Hockey Arena, Harbin; Attendance: 2,089 |

Game reference

Lee Yi-cheng
Goalies
Dominik Vollenweider
Referees:
Wang Gongbo (CHN)
Faris Hakimin Yusoff (MAS)

| Chang (Lin H., Lin J.) – 22:42 | 1–0 |
| Wen (Lin Y.C., Peng) – 30:09 | 2–0 |
| Lin Y.C. (SH) – 44:36 | 3–0 |
| | 3–1 | 53:15 – Aarola (Kindborn, Yannakornthanapunt) (PP) |

16 min
Penalties
8 min
41
Shots
36

Quarterfinals

| 11 February; 20:00 | Japan | 15–2 (3–1, 6–1, 6–0) | Thailand | Harbin Sport University Stadium, Harbin; Attendance: 1,163 |

Game reference

Eiki Sato
Issa Otsuka
Goalies
Ben Kleineschay
Referees:
Li Ho Ching (HKG)
Liu Jiaqi (CHN)

| Kobayashi (Nakajima) – 03:36 | 1–0 |
| Suzuki (Kobayashi, Yoneyama) – 14:12 | 2–0 |
| Osawa (Yamada, Ishida) – 18:54 | 3–0 |
| | 3–1 | 19:34 – Aarola (Lampson, Kindborn) |
| K. Otsu (Takagi, Hayata) – 22:26 | 4–1 |
| Nakajima (Hayata, Yoneyama) – 26:23 | 5–1 |
| | 5–2 | 28:35 – Forstner (Lampson) |
| Irikura (Hitosato, Yoneyama) (PP) – 32:41 | 6–2 |
| Isogai (Hitosato, Yoneyama) (PP) – 33:07 | 7–2 |
| Kobayashi (Suzuki, Hayata) – 35:51 | 8–2 |
| Irikura (Hitosato, Hayata) – 38:32 | 9–2 |
| Yamada (Isogai, Irikura) – 40:22 | 10–2 |
| Takagi (K. Otsu, Osawa) – 41:56 | 11–2 |
| Kobayashi (Yoneyama, Nakajima) – 43:54 | 12–2 |
| Hayata (Nakajima) – 44:07 | 13–2 |
| Halliday – 44:56 | 14–2 |
| K. Otsu (Osawa, Yoneyama) – 50:13 | 15–2 |

10 min
Penalties
12 min
79
Shots
10

=== Women's tournament ===
Thailand qualified after being ranked as one of the top eight teams in Asia on the IIHF World Ranking as of May 2024.

Team roster

The following is the Thai roster in the women's ice hockey tournament (22 female ice hockey players).

Head coach: (Canada) Rory Joseph Rawlyk

| No. | Pos. | Name | Height | Weight | Birthdate | Team |
|---|---|---|---|---|---|---|
| 1 | G | Thamida Kunthadapakorn | 5 ft 8 in (173 cm) | 130 lb (59 kg) | August 4, 2006 (aged 18) | (Thailand) Bangkok Warriors |
| 2 | G | Wilaksaya Watthanakulcharoenchai | 5 ft 4 in (163 cm) | 163 lb (74 kg) | July 20, 1994 (aged 30) | (Thailand) Zeus Bangkok |
| 3 | D | Nisthanant Loykulnant | 5 ft 1 in (155 cm) | 101 lb (46 kg) | February 13, 2004 (aged 20) | (Thailand) Canstar Rangers |
| 5 | F | Varachanant Boonyubol | 5 ft 3 in (160 cm) | 119 lb (54 kg) | September 26, 1988 (aged 36) | (Thailand) Zeus Bangkok |
| 6 | F | Avita Pothong | 5 ft 3 in (160 cm) | 110 lb (50 kg) | August 10, 2006 (aged 18) | (Thailand) Ice Breakers |
| 7 | F | Supitsara Thamma | 5 ft 2 in (157 cm) | 104 lb (47 kg) | August 5, 2006 (aged 18) | (Thailand) Greatest Ice |
| 8 | F | Phraephailin Khanpakdee | 5 ft 5 in (165 cm) | 121 lb (55 kg) | April 13, 2003 (aged 21) | (Thailand) 25G |
| 9 | F | Pacharamon Vorawat | 5 ft 4 in (163 cm) | 117 lb (53 kg) | October 23, 2007 (aged 17) | (Thailand) Nakaraj |
| 10 | F | Woranittha Sirivikul | 5 ft 4 in (163 cm) | 121 lb (55 kg) | September 13, 2006 (aged 18) | (Thailand) Bangkok Warriors |
| 11 | D | Prim Dejthai | 5 ft 5 in (165 cm) | 141 lb (64 kg) | October 18, 2007 (aged 17) | (Thailand) 25G |
| 12 | F | Pattranid Sornprom | 5 ft 3 in (160 cm) | 115 lb (52 kg) | December 26, 2006 (aged 18) | (Thailand) Bangkok Warriors |
| 13 | F | Apichaya Kosanunt | 5 ft 5 in (165 cm) | 110 lb (50 kg) | November 3, 2006 (aged 18) | (Thailand) Bangkok Warriors |
| 14 | D | Marisa Chimpradid | 5 ft 5 in (165 cm) | 123 lb (56 kg) | July 3, 2007 (aged 17) | (Thailand) Bangkok Warriors |
| 15 | F | Pawarisa Sakchaicharoenkul | 5 ft 6 in (168 cm) | 117 lb (53 kg) | December 17, 2006 (aged 18) | (Thailand) 25G |
| 16 | F | Wirasinee Rattananai | 5 ft 6 in (168 cm) | 132 lb (60 kg) | November 20, 1995 (aged 29) | (Thailand) Bangkok Warriors |
| 17 | F | Rinrada Poka | 5 ft 4 in (163 cm) | 110 lb (50 kg) | July 26, 1997 (aged 27) | (Thailand) Grizzly |
| 18 | F | Phraephloi Khanpakdee | 5 ft 3 in (160 cm) | 121 lb (55 kg) | April 13, 2003 (aged 21) | (Thailand) 25G |
| 19 | D | Suwipa Panyamaneerat | 5 ft 5 in (165 cm) | 141 lb (64 kg) | March 31, 2005 (aged 19) | (Thailand) 25G |
| 21 | F | Thipwarintorn Yannakornthanapunt | 5 ft 9 in (175 cm) | 139 lb (63 kg) | May 14, 2006 (aged 18) | (Thailand) Bangkok Warriors |
| 22 | D | Kanpitcha Saentes | 5 ft 1 in (155 cm) | 176 lb (80 kg) | May 21, 2005 (aged 19) | (Thailand) IHAT |
| 23 | D | Sirikarn Jittresin | 5 ft 3 in (160 cm) | 141 lb (64 kg) | September 14, 1983 (aged 41) | (Thailand) Panther |
| 24 | D | Jaravee Srichamnong | 5 ft 3 in (160 cm) | 161 lb (73 kg) | July 25, 1998 (aged 26) | (Thailand) Zeus Bangkok |

Preliminary round

| Pos | Team | Pld | W | OW | OL | L | GF | GA | GD | Pts | Qualification |
|---|---|---|---|---|---|---|---|---|---|---|---|
| 1 | Kazakhstan | 4 | 3 | 1 | 0 | 0 | 27 | 1 | +26 | 11 | Final round |
| 2 | South Korea | 4 | 3 | 0 | 1 | 0 | 22 | 3 | +19 | 10 | Final round |
| 3 | Chinese Taipei | 4 | 2 | 0 | 0 | 2 | 13 | 10 | +3 | 6 | |
| 4 | Thailand | 4 | 1 | 0 | 0 | 3 | 3 | 25 | −22 | 3 | |
| 5 | Hong Kong | 4 | 0 | 0 | 0 | 4 | 2 | 28 | −26 | 0 | |

Source: OCA

| 3 February; 15:30 | Thailand | 1–4 (0–2, 1–1, 0–1) | Chinese Taipei | Harbin Sport University Stadium, Harbin; Attendance: 1,133 |

Game reference

Thamida Kunthadapakorn
Goalies
Hsu Tzu-ting
Referees:
Lee Kyung-sun (KOR)
Wan Mei Wah (MAS)

| | 0–1 | 17:16 – Chang E.N. (Hsu Y., Tan) (PP) |
| | 0–2 | 18:13 – Huang Y. (Hsu Y., Chang E.N.) (PP) |
| | 0–3 | 34:32 – Wu (Yeh H., Liu C.) |
| Yannakornthanapunt (Vorawat, Panyamaneerat) – 39:02 | 1–3 |
| | 1–4 | 59:01 – Huang M. (SH) |

8 min
Penalties
8 min
15
Shots
42

| 4 February; 19:30 | Kazakhstan | 9–0 (2–0, 3–0, 4–0) | Thailand | Harbin Sport University Stadium, Harbin; Attendance: 1,019 |

Game reference

Arina Chshyokolova
Goalies
Thamida Kunthadapakorn
Referees:
Lee Kyung-sun (KOR)
Miyuki Nakayama (JPN)

| Zubkova (Olzhabayeva) – 13:03 | 1–0 |
| Orazbayeva (Moldabay, Tursynova) (PP) – 17:33 | 2–0 |
| Filimonova (Shegay, Tursynova) – 29:36 | 3–0 |
| Zubkova (Olzhabayeva, Aldabergenova) – 30:35 | 4–0 |
| Zubkova (Voronova, Aldabergenova) – 31:08 | 5–0 |
| M. Sayakhatkyzy (Zubkova, D. Sayakhatkyzy) – 50:20 | 6–0 |
| Shegay (Moldabay) – 53:42 | 7–0 |
| Zubkova (Meskini, M. Sayakhatkyzy) – 55:28 | 8–0 |
| Pyatkova (Ashimova, Olzhabayeva) (PP) – 57:44 | 9–0 |

2 min
Penalties
14 min
64
Shots
5

| 6 February; 15:30 | South Korea | 11–0 (2–0, 5–0, 4–0) | Thailand | Harbin Sport University Stadium, Harbin; Attendance: 1,014 |

Game reference

Kim Yeon-ju
Bae Jeong-yeon
Goalies
Thamida Kunthadapakorn
Wilaksaya Watthanakulcharoenchai
Referees:
Liu Lu (CHN)
Song Meina (CHN)

| Jung S. (Choi, Park Ju-Y.) – 02:12 | 1–0 |
| Eom (Choi) – 05:16 | 2–0 |
| Kim S. (Kim D., Park J.A.) – 22:31 | 3–0 |
| Choi (Lee E. Sr., Kim S.) (PP) – 32:54 | 4–0 |
| Eom (Choi) – 34:06 | 5–0 |
| Lee E. Sr. (Park J.A., Lee E. Jr.) – 36:29 | 6–0 |
| Park Y. (Kang N., Song) – 38:54 | 7–0 |
| Lee E. Jr. (Lee E. Sr., Park J.A.) – 45:12 | 8–0 |
| Park M. (Jung Y., Kang N.) – 47:59 | 9–0 |
| Park Ji-Y. (Eom, Lee S.) – 53:45 | 10–0 |
| Han Y. (Han S., Kim S.) – 55:44 | 11–0 |

6 min
Penalties
6 min
72
Shots
1

| 8 February; 19:30 | Hong Kong | 1–2 (0–0, 1–1, 0–1) | Thailand | Harbin Sport University Stadium, Harbin; Attendance: 1,097 |

Game reference

Mok Hei Lam
Goalies
Thamida Kunthadapakorn
Referees:
Miyuki Nakayama (JPN)
Song Meina (CHN)

| Lam (Tsui, Ip) – 25:47 | 1–0 |
| | 1–1 | 38:54 – Sakchaicharoenkul (Vorawat, Panyamaneerat) |
| | 1–2 | 51:26 – Vorawat (Thamma, Jittresin) |

6 min
Penalties
4 min
32
Shots
25

== Short-track speed skating ==
Thailand entered four male and two female short-track speed skaters.

Men

| Athlete | Event | Heat | | Quarterfinal | | Semifinal | | Final | |
| Athlete | Event | Time | Rank | Time | Rank | Time | Rank | Time | Rank |
|---|---|---|---|---|---|---|---|---|---|
| Chirawat Phonkat | 500 m | 44.955 | 4 | Did not advance | | | | | 28 |
| Chonlachart Taprom | 500 m | 42.975 | 3 q | 43.827 | 4 | Did not advance | | | 15 |
| Prakit Borvornmongkolsak | 500 m | 44.010 | 4 | Did not advance | | | | | 26 |
| Chonlachart Taprom | 1000 m | 1:30.935 | 3 q | 1:30.943 | 5 | Did not advance | | | 20 |
| Phooripat Changmai | 1000 m | 1:36.040 | 3 | Did not advance | | | | | 24 |
| Prakit Borvornmongkolsak | 1000 m | 1:42.414 | 3 ADV | 1:30.124 | 5 | Did not advance | | | 19 |
| Chirawat Phonkat | 1500 m | — | | 2:51.360 | 5 | Did not advance | | | 29 |
| Chonlachart Taprom | 1500 m | — | | 2:20.864 | 2 Q | 2:28.614 | 7 | Did not advance | 19 |
| Phooripat Changmai | 1500 m | — | | 2:24.500 | 2 Q | PEN | | Did not advance | 21 |

Qualification legend: Q - Qualify based on position in heat; q - Qualify based on time in field; ADV - Advanced to next round on referee decision

Women

| Athlete | Event | Heat | | Quarterfinal | | Semifinal | | Final | |
| Athlete | Event | Time | Rank | Time | Rank | Time | Rank | Time | Rank |
|---|---|---|---|---|---|---|---|---|---|
| Punpreeda Prempreecha | 500 m | 48.488 | 4 | Did not advance | | | | | 19 |
| Thanutchaya Chatthaisong | 500 m | 46.295 | 2 Q | 45.043 | 3 | Did not advance | | | 11 |
| Punpreeda Prempreecha | 1000 m | 1:39.922 | 4 | Did not advance | | | | | 14 |
| Thanutchaya Chatthaisong | 1000 m | 1:38.799 | 2 Q | 1:32.588 | 4 | Did not advance | | | 17 |
| Punpreeda Prempreecha | 1500 m | — | | 2:39.076 | 4 q | 2:34.879 | 4 FB | 2:46.781 | 13 |
| Thanutchaya Chatthaisong | 1500 m | — | | 2:43.975 | 2 Q | 2:33.243 | 3 FB | 2:39.944 | 9 |

Qualification legend: Q - Qualify based on position in heat; q - Qualify based on time in field; FB - Qualify to consolation final

Mixed

| Athlete | Event | Quarterfinal | | Semifinal | | Final | |
| Athlete | Event | Time | Rank | Time | Rank | Time | Rank |
|---|---|---|---|---|---|---|---|
| Chonlachart Taprom; Phooripat Changmai; Punpreeda Prempreecha; Thanutchaya Chatthaisong | 2000 m relay | 2:50.870 | 2 Q | 2:49.402 | 3 FB | 3:02.320 | 5 |

Qualification legend: Q - Qualify based on position in heat; FB - Qualify to consolation final

== Ski mountaineering ==
Thailand entered one male ski mountaineer.

Men

| Athlete | Event | Qualification | | Semifinal | | Final | |
| Athlete | Event | Time | Rank | Time | Rank | Time | Rank |
|---|---|---|---|---|---|---|---|
| Jeremy Poumine Knoerr | Sprint | 3:39.39 | 12 Q | 3:35.38 | 6 | Did not advance | 11 |

Qualification legend: Q - Qualify to next round

== Snowboarding ==
Thailand entered one male snowboarder.

| Athlete | Event | Qualification | | | | | Final | | | | |
| Athlete | Event | Run 1 | Run 2 | Run 3 | Best | Rank | Run 1 | Run 2 | Run 3 | Best | Rank |
|---|---|---|---|---|---|---|---|---|---|---|---|
| Lubpawath Chayametisurat | Big air | — | | | | | 13.50 | 15.75 | 34.75 | 50.50 | 7 |
| Lubpawath Chayametisurat | Slopestyle | 20.25 | 44.00 | — | 44.00 | 7 Q | DNS | | | | 8 |

Qualification legend: Q - Qualify to next round

== Speed skating ==
Thailand entered one male speed skater.

Men

| Athlete | Event | Time | Rank |
|---|---|---|---|
| Nopphaket Suansuk | 100 m | 11.79 | 22 |
| Nopphaket Suansuk | 500 m | 44.49 | 22 |
| Nopphaket Suansuk | 1000 m | 1:31.48 | 23 |
