= Kazakhstan at the 2025 Asian Winter Games =

- Flag of Kazakhstan
- IOC code: KAZ
- NOC: National Olympic Committee of the Republic of Kazakhstan

in Harbin, China 7 February 2025 – 14 February 2025
- Competitors: 138 in 10 sports
- Flag bearer (opening): Adil Beketayev & Olga Tikhonova
- Flag bearer (closing): TBD
- Medals Ranked 4th: Gold 4 Silver 9 Bronze 7 Total 20

Asian Winter Games appearances
- 1996; 1999; 2003; 2007; 2011; 2017; 2025; 2029

Kazakhstan competed in the 2025 Asian Winter Games in Harbin, China, from February 7 to 14. The Kazakhstani delegation consisted of 138 athletes competing in all sports (ten) except snowboarding.

During the opening ceremony, hockey player Adil Beketayev and short track speed skater Olga Tikhonova were the country's flagbearers. The Kazakhstani team finished the Games with a total of 20 medals.

== Competitors ==
The following table lists the Kazakhstani delegation per sport and gender.

Sport	Men	Women	Total
Alpine skiing	4	4	8
Biathlon	5	5	10
Cross-country skiing	6	6	12
Curling	6	6	12
Figure skating	3	3	6
Freestyle skiing	5	2	7
Ice hockey	23	23	46
Short-track speed skating	6	6	12
Ski mountaineering	4	1	5
Speed skating	10	10	20
Total	72	66	138

== Medal summary ==
=== Medal table ===
Sport	Gold	Silver	Bronze	Total
Biathlon	1	2	1	4
Short-track speed skating	1	2	0	3
Freestyle skiing	1	1	2	4
Ice hockey	1	1	0	2
Cross-country skiing	0	2	2	4
Speed skating	0	1	1	2
Figure skating	0	0	1	1
Totals (7 entries)	4	9	7	20

=== Medalists ===
Medal	Name	Sport	Event	Date
Gold	Adil Galiakhmetov; Gleb Ivchenko; Denis Nikisha; Mersaid Zhaxybayev; Abzal Azhgaliyev; Aibek Nassen	Short-track speed skating	Men's 5000 metre relay	9 February
Gold	Vladislav Kireyev	Biathlon	Men's sprint	11 February
Gold	Roman Ivanov; Sherzod Khashirbayev	Freestyle skiing	Men's synchro aerials	11 February
Gold	Kazakhstan	Ice hockey	Men's tournament	14 February
Silver	Adil Galiakhmetov; Yana Khan; Denis Nikisha; Malika Yermek; Abzal Azhgaliyev; Alina Azhgaliyeva; Olga Tikhonova; Mersaid Zhaxybayev	Short-track speed skating	Mixed 2000 metre relay	8 February
Silver	Konstantin Bortsov	Cross-country skiing	Men's sprint classical	8 February
Silver	Yevgeniy Koshkin	Speed skating	Men's 100 metres	8 February
Silver	Alina Azhgaliyeva; Yana Khan; Olga Tikhonova; Malika Yermek; Zeinep Kumarkan; Madina Zhanbussinova	Short-track speed skating	Women's 3000 metre relay	9 February
Silver	Ayana Zholdas; Sherzod Khashirbayev; Assylkhan Assan	Freestyle skiing	Mixed team aerials	10 February
Silver	Vadim Kurales	Biathlon	Men's sprint	11 February
Silver	Xeniya Shalygina; Kamila Yelgazinova; Angelina Shuryga; Nadezhda Stepashkina	Cross-country skiing	Women's 4 × 5 km relay	12 February
Silver	Alexandr Mukhin; Asset Dyussenov; Kirill Bauer; Vladislav Kireyev	Biathlon	Men's relay	13 February
Silver	Kazakhstan	Ice hockey	Women's tournament	14 February
Bronze	Ayana Zholdas	Freestyle skiing	Women's aerials	9 February
Bronze	Nadezhda Morozova; Kristina Silaeva; Darya Vazhenina	Speed skating	Women's team sprint	9 February
Bronze	Olzhas Klimin	Cross-country skiing	Men's 10 km freestyle	10 February
Bronze	Ardana Makhanova; Ayana Zholdas	Freestyle skiing	Women's synchro aerials	11 February
Bronze	Konstantin Bortsov; Nail Bashmakov; Olzhas Klimin; Vladislav Kovalyov	Cross-country skiing	Men's 4 × 7,5 km relay	12 February
Bronze	Olga Poltoranina; Darya Klimina; Arina Kryukova; Yelizaveta Beletskaya	Biathlon	Women's relay	13 February
Bronze	Mikhail Shaidorov	Figure skating	Men's singles	13 February

== Alpine skiing ==
Kazakhstan entered eight alpine skiers (four per gender).

Men

Athlete	Event	Run 1		Run 2		Total	
Athlete	Event	Time	Rank	Time	Rank	Time	Rank
Rostislav Khokhlov	Slalom	DNF					
Zakhar Kuchin	Slalom	49,29	14	47,95	10	1:37,24	11
Alexey Kulakov	Slalom	50,95	18	DSQ			
Danil Syssoyev	Slalom	DNF					

Women

Athlete	Event	Run 1		Run 2		Total	
Athlete	Event	Time	Rank	Time	Rank	Time	Rank
Xeniya Berezhnaya	Slalom	54,86	11	52,55	10	1:47,41	10
Mariya Shkabarova	Slalom	53,44	10	51,17	9	1:44,61	9
Alexandra Skorokhodova	Slalom	48,44	4	DNF			
Alexandra Troitskaya	Slalom	55,23	13	DSQ			

== Biathlon ==
Men

Athlete	Event	Time	Misses	Rank
Vladislav Kireyev	Sprint	29:47.4	1 (1+0)	1st place, gold medalist(s)
Vadim Kurales	Sprint	30:13.1	2 (0+2)	2nd place, silver medalist(s)
Asset Dyussenov	Sprint	30:40.6	3 (1+2)	6
Alexandr Mukhin	Sprint	31:03.8	5 (2+3)	7
Alexandr Mukhin; Asset Dyussenov; Kirill Bauer; Vladislav Kireyev	Relay	1:25:18.7	5+15	2nd place, silver medalist(s)

Women

Athlete	Event	Time	Misses	Rank
Arina Kryukova	Sprint	23:06.5	1 (1+0)	4
Olga Poltoranina	Sprint	23:17.8	0 (0+0)	5
Darya Klimina	Sprint	23:30.7	2 (1+1)	7
Polina Yegorova	Sprint	25:00.9	2 (0+2)	13
Olga Poltoranina; Darya Klimina; Arina Kryukova; Yelizaveta Beletskaya	Relay	1:30:01.9	3+13	3rd place, bronze medalist(s)

== Cross-country skiing ==
Distance
Men

Athlete	Event	Total		
Athlete	Event	Time	Deficit	Rank
Olzhas Klimin	10 km freestyle	21:20.3	+13.8	3rd place, bronze medalist(s)
Vladislav Kovalyov	10 km freestyle	21:52.6	+46.1	6
Nail Bashmakov	10 km freestyle	22:12.8	+1:06.3	10
Yernar Nursbekov	10 km freestyle	23:10.8	+2:04.3	16
Konstantin Bortsov; Nail Bashmakov; Olzhas Klimin; Vladislav Kovalyov	4 × 7.5 km relay	1:12:54.7	+45.1	3rd place, bronze medalist(s)

Women

Athlete	Event	Total		
Athlete	Event	Time	Deficit	Rank
Nadezhda Stepashkina	5 km freestyle	12:25.6	+18.1	5
Xeniya Shalygina	5 km freestyle	12:45.7	+38.2	7
Angelina Shuryga	5 km freestyle	12:54.9	+47.4	8
Darya Ryazhko	5 km freestyle	13:03.5	+56.0	9
Xeniya Shalygina; Kamila Yelgazinova; Angelina Shuryga; Nadezhda Stepashkina	4 × 5 km relay	55:24.5	+1:25.2	2nd place, silver medalist(s)

Sprint
Men

Athlete	Event	Qualification		Quarterfinals		Semifinals		Final	
Athlete	Event	Time	Rank	Time	Rank	Time	Rank	Time	Rank
Konstantin Bortsov	Sprint classical	3:04.40	5 Q	3:06.48	2 Q	2:59.97	1 Q	2:58.28	2nd place, silver medalist(s)
Olzhas Klimin	Sprint classical	3:08.35	7 Q	3:06.33	2 Q	2:58.24	3 q	2:58.90	4
Iliyas Issabek	Sprint classical	3:08.46	8 Q	3:05.89	2 Q	3:04.36	5	Did not advance	
Vladislav Kovalyov	Sprint classical	3:12.91	12 Q	3:12.10	1 Q	3:02.15	4	Did not advance	

Women

Athlete	Event	Qualification		Quarterfinals		Semifinals		Final	
Athlete	Event	Time	Rank	Time	Rank	Time	Rank	Time	Rank
Darya Ryazhko	Sprint classical	3:46.99	1 Q	3:44.35	1 Q	3:32.56	3 q	3:34.35	4
Nadezhda Stepashkina	Sprint classical	3:40.50	4 Q	3:48.89	2 Q	3:31.44	3 q	3:36.47	5
Xeniya Shalygina	Sprint classical	3:44.90	7 Q	3:48.36	1 Q	3:38.43	5	Did not advance	
Mariya Lyuft	Sprint classical	3:55.84	11 Q	3:41.33	2 Q	3:38.00	4	Did not advance	

== Curling ==
Summary

Team	Event	Group stage									Qualification	Semifinal	Final / BM	
Team	Event	Opposition Score	Opposition Score	Opposition Score	Opposition Score	Opposition Score	Opposition Score	Opposition Score	Opposition Score	Rank	Opposition Score	Opposition Score	Opposition Score	Rank
Abylaikhan Zhuzbay; Aidos Alliyar; Adil Zhumagozha; Yermek Mussainov; Arman Irjanov	Men's team	Chinese Taipei; W 10–5	Philippines; L 1–4	South Korea; L 2–12	Kyrgyzstan; W 6–3	—				3 Q	Hong Kong; L 5–8	Did not advance		6
Tilsimay Alliyarova; Yekaterina Kolykhalova; Angelina Ebauyer; Merey Tastemir; Yana Ebauyer	Women's team	Japan; L 4–10	Chinese Taipei; W 14–0	China; L 4–11	Philippines; W 5–4	Qatar; W 11–2	South Korea; L 2–8	Thailand; W 9–1	Hong Kong; W 6–3	4 Q	—	South Korea; L 2–10	Japan; L 3–6	4
Amina Seitzhanova; Azizbek Nadirbayev	Mixed doubles	China; L 5–11	South Korea; L 0–12	Qatar; W 7–4	Kyrgyzstan; W 12–5	Philippines; L 2–11	—			4	Did not advance			7

=== Men's tournament ===
Kazakhstan entered a men's team.

Round robin

Group A	Skip	W	L	W–L	PF	PA	EW	EL	BE	SE	DSC
South Korea	Lee Jae-beom	4	0	–	43	5	19	5	1	11	83.43
Philippines	Marc Pfister	3	1	–	28	12	11	9	5	2	78.11
Kazakhstan	Abylaikhan Zhuzbay	2	2	–	19	24	12	12	0	4	73.49
Chinese Taipei	Liu Bor-kai	1	3	–	16	35	9	17	0	2	108.93
Kyrgyzstan	Aibek Asanaliev	0	4	–	10	40	9	17	0	0	77.01

Draw 1

Sunday, 9 February, 13:00

Sheet E	1	2	3	4	5	6	7	8	Final
Chinese Taipei (Liu)	0	4	0	0	0	0	1	X	5
Kazakhstan (Zhuzbay)	3	0	3	1	1	2	0	X	10

Draw 3

Monday, 10 February, 9:00

Sheet D	1	2	3	4	5	6	7	8	Final
Kazakhstan (Zhuzbay)	0	0	0	1	0	0	0	X	1
Philippines (Pfister)	0	0	2	0	0	0	2	X	4

Draw 6

Tuesday, 11 February, 14:00

Sheet C	1	2	3	4	5	6	7	8	Final
Kazakhstan (Zhuzbay)	0	1	0	1	0	0	0	X	2
South Korea (Lee)	1	0	1	0	2	4	4	X	12

Draw 8

Wednesday, 12 February, 14:00

Sheet B	1	2	3	4	5	6	7	8	Final
Kyrgyzstan (Asanaliev)	0	1	0	1	0	0	1	X	3
Kazakhstan (Zhuzbay)	1	0	3	0	1	1	0	X	6

Qualification

Thursday, 13 February, 14:00

Sheet C	1	2	3	4	5	6	7	8	Final
Hong Kong (Chang)	0	1	0	3	0	2	1	1	8
Kazakhstan (Zhuzbay)	1	0	1	0	3	0	0	0	5

=== Women's tournament ===
Kazakhstan entered a women's team.

Round robin

Team	Skip	W	L	W–L	PF	PA	EW	EL	BE	SE	DSC
South Korea	Gim Eun-ji	8	0	–	63	14	33	11	0	18	45.90
China	Wang Rui	7	1	–	85	21	34	17	3	18	38.69
Japan	Yuina Miura	6	2	–	68	30	32	19	2	14	58.25
Kazakhstan	Angelina Ebauyer	5	3	–	55	39	28	22	1	14	54.81
Philippines	Kathleen Dubberstein	4	4	–	61	36	32	21	1	16	85.56
Hong Kong	Ling-Yue Hung	3	5	–	44	45	24	29	1	11	115.69
Chinese Taipei	Yang Ko	2	6	–	29	75	16	34	1	4	107.27
Thailand	Kanya Natchanarong	1	7	–	19	91	15	30	0	7	128.48
Qatar	Sara Al-Qaet	0	8	–	11	84	8	33	1	5	180.65

Draw 1

Sunday, 9 February, 9:00

Sheet D	1	2	3	4	5	6	7	8	Final
Kazakhstan (Ebauyer)	0	2	0	1	0	1	0	X	4
Japan (Miura)	3	0	3	0	3	0	1	X	10

Draw 3

Monday, 10 February, 9:00

Sheet C	1	2	3	4	5	6	7	8	Final
Chinese Taipei (Yang)	0	0	0	0	0	0	X	X	0
Kazakhstan (Ebauyer)	3	0	1	4	1	5	X	X	14

Draw 4

Monday, 10 February, 19:00

Sheet A	1	2	3	4	5	6	7	8	Final
China (Wang)	3	2	0	3	1	0	2	X	11
Kazakhstan (Ebauyer)	0	0	2	0	0	2	0	X	4

Draw 5

Tuesday, 11 February, 9:00

Sheet B	1	2	3	4	5	6	7	8	Final
Kazakhstan (Ebauyer)	0	2	0	1	1	0	0	1	5
Philippines (Dubberstein)	1	0	1	0	0	1	1	0	4

Draw 6

Tuesday, 11 February, 19:00

Sheet C	1	2	3	4	5	6	7	8	Final
Kazakhstan (Ebauyer)	0	0	3	4	1	3	X	X	11
Qatar (Al-Qaet)	1	1	0	0	0	0	X	X	2

Draw 7

Wednesday, 12 February, 9:00

Sheet D	1	2	3	4	5	6	7	8	Final
South Korea (Gim)	2	0	3	0	2	1	X	X	8
Kazakhstan (Ebauyer)	0	1	0	1	0	0	X	X	2

Draw 8

Wednesday, 12 February, 19:00

Sheet E	1	2	3	4	5	6	7	8	Final
Kazakhstan (Ebauyer)	0	2	1	1	3	2	X	X	9
Thailand (Natchanarong)	1	0	0	0	0	0	X	X	1

Draw 9

Thursday, 13 February, 9:00

Sheet B	1	2	3	4	5	6	7	8	Final
Hong Kong (Hung)	0	1	0	2	0	0	0	X	3
Kazakhstan (Ebauyer)	0	0	2	0	1	3	0	X	6

Semifinal

Thursday, 13 February, 19:00

Sheet C	1	2	3	4	5	6	7	8	Final
South Korea (Gim)	5	0	3	0	1	1	X	X	10
Kazakhstan (Ebauyer)	0	1	0	1	0	0	X	X	2

Bronze Medal Game

Friday, 14 February, 13:00

Sheet B	1	2	3	4	5	6	7	8	Final
Kazakhstan (Ebauyer)	0	0	0	2	0	0	1	X	3
Japan (Miura)	0	1	1	0	3	1	0	X	6

=== Mixed doubles tournament ===
Kazakhstan entered a mixed doubles pair.

Round robin

Group B	Athletes	W	L	W–L	PF	PA	EW	EL	BE	SE	DSC
China	Han Yu / Wang Zhiyu	5	0	–	44	19	23	11	0	12	37.46
Philippines	Kathleen Dubberstein / Marc Pfister	4	1	–	50	22	21	13	0	12	58.24
South Korea	Kim Kyeong-ae / Seong Ji-hoon	3	2	–	50	22	24	9	0	14	47.83
Kazakhstan	Amina Seitzhanova / Azizbek Nadirbayev	2	3	–	26	43	14	21	0	6	55.33
Kyrgyzstan	Keremet Asanbaeva / Iskhak Abykeev	1	4	–	21	50	13	23	0	4	114.23
Qatar	Mabarka Al-Abdulla / Nasser Alyafei	0	5	–	15	50	8	26	0	1	98.31

Draw 1

Tuesday, 4 February, 10:00

Sheet C	1	2	3	4	5	6	7	8	Final
China (Han / Wang)	1	2	0	3	4	0	1	X	11
Kazakhstan (Seitzhanova / Nadirbayev)	0	0	1	0	0	4	0	X	5

Draw 3

Wednesday, 5 February, 10:00

Sheet A	1	2	3	4	5	6	7	8	Final
Kazakhstan (Seitzhanova / Nadirbayev)	0	0	0	0	0	0	X	X	0
South Korea (Kim / Seong)	6	1	1	2	1	1	X	X	12

Draw 5

Wednesday, 5 February, 18:00

Sheet D	1	2	3	4	5	6	7	8	Final
Kazakhstan (Seitzhanova / Nadirbayev)	1	2	0	1	1	1	0	1	7
Qatar (Al-Abdulla / Alyafei)	0	0	2	0	0	0	2	0	4

Draw 6

Thursday, 6 February, 10:00

Sheet E	1	2	3	4	5	6	7	8	Final
Kazakhstan (Seitzhanova / Nadirbayev)	1	0	3	3	0	4	1	X	12
Kyrgyzstan (Asanbaeva / Abykeev)	0	2	0	0	3	0	0	X	5

Draw 8

Thursday, 6 February, 18:00

Sheet B	1	2	3	4	5	6	7	8	Final
Philippines (Dubberstein / Pfister)	2	4	1	1	1	0	2	X	11
Kazakhstan (Seitzhanova / Nadirbayev)	0	0	0	0	0	2	0	X	2

== Figure skating ==
Kazakhstan's figure skating team consists of six athletes (three men and three women).

Singles

Athlete(s)	Event	SP		FP		Total	
Athlete(s)	Event	Points	Rank	Points	Rank	Points	Rank
Dias Jirenbayev	Men's	65.56	8	120.62	9	186.18	9
Mikhail Shaidorov	Men's	76.75	4	169.26	2	246.01	3rd place, bronze medalist(s)
Sofiya Farafonova	Women's	45.63	9	79.64	10	125.27	10
Sofia Samodelkina	Women's	63.31	4	125.12	4	188.43	4

Ice dance

Athlete(s)	Event	SP		FP		Total	
Athlete(s)	Event	Points	Rank	Points	Rank	Points	Rank
Gaukhar Nauryzova; Boisangur Datiev	Ice dance	55.02	5	87.14	5	142.16	5

== Freestyle skiing ==
Aerials
Men

Athlete	Event	Final 1				Final 2			
Athlete	Event	Run 1	Run 2	Best	Rank	Run 1	Run 2	Best	Rank
Assylkhan Assan	Aerials	88.83	90.48	90.48	5 Q	—		71.76	6
Ulanbakir Umurzakov	Aerials	52.17	86.31	86.31	6 Q	—		81.90	5
Roman Ivanov	Aerials	64.86	64.50	64.86	8	—		Did not advance	
Roman Ivanov; Sherzod Khashirbayev	Synchro aerials	—				75.71	97.92	97.92	1st place, gold medalist(s)
Assylkhan Assan; Dinmukhammed Raimkulov	Synchro aerials	—				83.96	70.42	83.96	4

Women

Athlete	Event	Final 1				Final 2			
Athlete	Event	Run 1	Run 2	Best	Rank	Run 1	Run 2	Best	Rank
Ayana Zholdas	Aerials	65.52	DNF	65.52	5 Q	—		76.54	3rd place, bronze medalist(s)
Ardana Makhanova	Aerials	DNS	39.56	39.56	7	—		Did not advance	
Ardana Makhanova; Ayana Zholdas	Synchro aerials	—				59.16	47.72	59.16	3rd place, bronze medalist(s)

Mixed

Athlete	Event	Final	
Athlete	Event	Best	Rank
Ayana Zholdas; Sherzod Khashirbayev; Assylkhan Assan	Aerials	235.39	2nd place, silver medalist(s)

== Ice hockey ==
Summary

Key:

- OT – Overtime
- GWS – Match decided by penalty-shootout

Team	Event	Group stage						Qualification Playoffs	Quarterfinal	Semifinal	Final / BM	
Team	Event	Opposition Score	Opposition Score	Opposition Score	Opposition Score	Opposition Score	Rank	Opposition Score	Opposition Score	Opposition Score	Opposition Score	Rank
Kazakhstan men's	Men	Thailand; W 12–0	China; W 6–1	Chinese Taipei; W 17–0	Japan; W 4–1	South Korea; W 2–1	1 Q	Bye	Hong Kong; W 24–0	China; W 3–1	Japan; W 5–0	1st place, gold medalist(s)
Kazakhstan women's	Women	Japan; L 0–4	China; W 2–1	South Korea; W 3–0	—							2nd place, silver medalist(s)

=== Men's tournament ===
Kazakhstan qualified a men's hockey team of 23 athletes. The Kazakhstani team qualified after being ranked as one of the top 12 teams in Asia on the IIHF World Ranking as of May 2024.

Group stage

Pos	Team	Pld	W	OTW	OTL	L	GF	GA	GD	Pts	Qualification
1	Kazakhstan	5	5	0	0	0	41	3	+38	15	Quarterfinals
2	South Korea	5	3	1	0	1	36	10	+26	11	Quarterfinals
3	Japan	5	3	0	0	2	28	11	+17	9	Quarterfinals
4	China	5	2	0	1	2	20	14	+6	7	Quarterfinals
5	Chinese Taipei	5	1	0	0	4	4	52	−48	3	Quarterfinals
6	Thailand	5	0	0	0	5	2	41	−39	0	Quarterfinals

Source: Asian Winter Games 2025

4 February 2025; 16:00	Thailand	0–12 (0–4, 0–2, 0–6)	Kazakhstan	Harbin Ice Hockey Arena, Harbin; Attendance: 1,634

Game reference
Referees: (South Korea) Kang Tae-woo (China) Liu Jiaqi; Linesmen: (Chinese Taipei) Hung Chi-lun (China) Zhu Jialin

5 February 2025; 20:00	Kazakhstan	6–1 (3–0, 1–0, 2–1)	China	Harbin Ice Hockey Arena, Harbin; Attendance: 3,046

Game reference
Referees: (South Korea) Chae Young-jin (South Korea) Kang Tae-woo; Linesmen: (South Korea) Choi Do-yeon (South Korea) Su Won-il

7 February 2025; 9:00	Kazakhstan	17–0 (5–0, 5–0, 7–0)	Chinese Taipei	Harbin Ice Hockey Arena, Harbin; Attendance: 1,748

Game reference
Referees: (South Korea) Chae Young-jin (China) Wang Gongbo; Linesmen: (China) Gao Yinfeng (China) Liu Haotian

8 February 2025; 12:00	Japan	1–4 (1–1, 0–2, 0–1)	Kazakhstan	Harbin Ice Hockey Arena, Harbin; Attendance: 2,709

Game reference
Referees: (South Korea) Chae Young-jin (China) Wang Gongbo; Linesmen: (China) Fu Dahe (South Korea) Su Won-il

10 February 2025; 12:00	Kazakhstan	2–1 (0–1, 0–0, 2–0)	South Korea	Harbin Ice Hockey Arena, Harbin; Attendance: 2,079

Game reference
Referees: (China) Liu Jiaqi (Chinese Taipei) Shen Yen-chin; Linesmen: (China) Fu Dahe (China) Yuan Zhaoyang

Quarterfinals

11 February 2025; 16:00	Kazakhstan	24–0 (8–0, 7–0, 9–0)	Hong Kong	Harbin Ice Hockey Arena, Harbin; Attendance: 2,991

Game reference
Referees: (South Korea) Chae Young-jin (Malaysia) Mohamad Faris Hakimin Yusoff; Linesmen: (China) Liu Haotian (China) Zhu Jialin

Semifinals

13 February 2025; 10:00	Kazakhstan	3–1 (0–0, 2–0, 1–1)	China	Harbin Ice Hockey Arena, Harbin; Attendance: 3,144

Game reference
Referees: (South Korea) Chae Young-jin (Chinese Taipei) Shen Yen-chin; Linesmen: (China) Chi Hongda (Kazakhstan) Vladislav Mashenkin

Gold medal game

14 February 2025; 14:00	(gold) Kazakhstan	5–0 (1–0, 2–0, 2–0)	Japan (silver)	Harbin Ice Hockey Arena, Harbin; Attendance: 2,952

Game reference
Referees: (South Korea) Chae Young-jin (Kazakhstan) Konstantin Chubenko; Linesmen: (China) Chi Hongda (Kazakhstan) Timur Iskakov

=== Women's tournament ===
Kazakhstan qualified a women's hockey team of 23 athletes. The Kazakhstani team qualified after being ranked as one of the top eight teams in Asia on the IIHF World Ranking as of May 2024.

Preliminary round

Pos	Team	Pld	W	OTW	OTL	L	GF	GA	GD	Pts	Qualification
1	Kazakhstan	4	3	1	0	0	27	1	+26	11	Final round
2	South Korea	4	3	0	1	0	22	3	+19	10	Final round
3	Chinese Taipei	4	2	0	0	2	13	10	+3	6	
4	Thailand	4	1	0	0	3	3	25	−22	3	
5	Hong Kong	4	0	0	0	4	2	28	−26	0	

Source: Harbin2025

3 February 2025; 19:30	Hong Kong	0–12 (0–4, 0–5, 0–3)	Kazakhstan	Harbin Sport University Student Skating Hall, Harbin; Attendance: 1,133

Game reference

Hei Lam Mok
Goalies
Arina Chshyokolova
Referees:
(China) Liu Lu
(Japan) Miyuki Nakayama
Linesmen:
(South Korea) Park Jung-yoon
(China) Wang Hui

0–1	08:31 – M. Sayakhatkyzy (D. Sayakhatkyzy, Voronova)
0–2	11:21 – D. Sayakhatkyzy (Voronova, Zubkova)
0–3	13:27 – Sviridova (Pyatkova, Aldabergenova)
0–4	18:39 – D. Sayakhatkyzy (Ashimova, Sviridova)
0–5	20:35 – Tursynova (Shegay)
0–6	24:43 – Orazbayeva (Moldabay, Filimonova)
0–7	26:22 – D. Sayakhatkyzy (Butorina, Zubkova)
0–8	38:19 – Zubkova (Olzhabayeva, Ashimova)
0–9	38:28 – M. Sayakhatkyzy (Butorina, Voronova)
0–10	50:15 – Moldabay (Tursynova, Filimonova)
0–11	56:24 – M. Sayakhatkyzy (Sviridova)
0–12	58:15 – Kutsenko (Koroleva)

4 min
Penalties
2 min
10
Shots
63

4 February 2025; 19:30	Kazakhstan	9–0 (2–0, 3–0, 4–0)	Thailand	Harbin Sport University Student Skating Hall, Harbin; Attendance: 1,019

Game reference

Arina Chshyokolova
Goalies
Thamida Kunthadapakorn
Referees:
(South Korea) Lee Kyung-sun
(Japan) Miyuki Nakayama
Linesmen:
(Japan) Kumiko Matsuo
(China) Wang Hui

Zubkova (Olzhabayeva) – 13:03	1–0
Orazbayeva (Moldabay, Tursynova) (PP1) – 17:33	2–0
Filimonova (Shegay, Tursynova) – 29:36	3–0
Zubkova (Olzhabayeva, Aldabergenova) – 30:35	4–0
Zubkova (Voronova, Aldabergenova) – 31:08	5–0
M. Sayakhatkyzy (Zubkova, D. Sayakhatkyzy) – 50:20	6–0
Shegay (Moldabay) – 53:42	7–0
Zubkova (Meskini, M. Sayakhatkyzy) – 55:28	8–0
Pyatkova (Ashimova, Olzhabayeva) (PP1) – 57:44	9–0

2 min
Penalties
14 min
64
Shots
5

6 February 2025; 19:30	Kazakhstan	5–1 (1–1, 4–0, 0–0)	Chinese Taipei	Harbin Sport University Student Skating Hall, Harbin; Attendance: 1,129

Game reference

Arina Chshyokolova
Goalies
Hsu Tzu-ting
Wang Yun-tzu
Referees:
(South Korea) Lee Kyung-sun
(Malaysia) Wan Mei Wah
Linesmen:
(South Korea) Park Jung-yoon
(Malaysia) Woon Yean Hui

	0–1	04:23 – Wu (Lin C.)
Sviridova – 12:24	1–1
Filimonova (Shegay, Orazbayeva) – 23:20	2–1
Butorina (Zubkova, Voronova) – 24:58	3–1
Aldabergenova (Sviridova, Ashimova) – 29:44	4–1
Filimonova (Orazbayeva, Moldabay) – 31:03	5–1

0 min
Penalties
14 min
50
Shots
16

9 February 2025; 15:30	South Korea	0–1 OT (0–0, 0–0, 0–0) (OT: 0–1)	Kazakhstan	Harbin Sport University Student Skating Hall, Harbin; Attendance: 1,033

Game reference
Kim Yeon-ju	Goalies	Arina Chshyokolova	Referees: (China) Liu Lu (Japan) Miyuki Nakayama; Linesmen: (China) Wang Hui (China) Zhang Wenxi
0–1 / 62:01 – Shegay			Referees: (China) Liu Lu (Japan) Miyuki Nakayama; Linesmen: (China) Wang Hui (China) Zhang Wenxi
0 min	Penalties	6 min	Referees: (China) Liu Lu (Japan) Miyuki Nakayama; Linesmen: (China) Wang Hui (China) Zhang Wenxi
21	Shots	16	Referees: (China) Liu Lu (Japan) Miyuki Nakayama; Linesmen: (China) Wang Hui (China) Zhang Wenxi

Final round

Pos	Team	Pld	W	OTW	OTL	L	GF	GA	GD	Pts	
1	Japan	3	3	0	0	0	18	1	+17	9	Gold Medal
2	Kazakhstan	3	2	0	0	1	5	5	0	6	Silver Medal
3	China	3	1	0	0	2	4	11	−7	3	Bronze Medal
4	South Korea	3	0	0	0	3	1	11	−10	0	

Source: Harbin2025

12 February 2025; 10:00	Kazakhstan	0–4 (0–1, 0–1, 0–2)	Japan	Harbin Sport University Student Skating Hall, Harbin; Attendance: 1,031

Game reference

Arina Chshyokolova
Goalies
Riko Kawaguchi
Referees:
(South Korea) Lee Kyung-sun
(China) Song Meina
Linesmen:
(South Korea) Park Jung-yoon
(China) Zhang Wenxi

0–1	16:26 – Enomoto (H. Yamashita, Wajima)
0–2	20:17 – Rir. Noro (Shiga, Ukita)
0–3	42:57 – Wajima (Ukita, Sato)
0–4	48:10 – Ito (Shiga, Sato)

4 min
Penalties
2 min
7
Shots
41

13 February 2025; 14:00	China	1–2 (0–0, 0–1, 1–1)	Kazakhstan	Harbin Sport University Student Skating Hall, Harbin; Attendance: 1,167

Game reference

Lai Guimin
Goalies
Arina Chshyokolova
Referees:
(Japan) Miyuki Nakayama
(Malaysia) Wan Mei Wah
Linesmen:
(South Korea) Park Jung-yoon
(Malaysia) Woon Yean Hui

	0–1	35:29 – PP1 – Filimonova (Shegay, Orazbayeva)
Wang J. (Qu) – 42:36	1–1
	1–2	48:37 – Shegay (Orazbayeva)

8 min
Penalties
0 min
34
Shots
23

14 February 2025; 10:00	South Korea	0–3 (0–1, 0–0, 0–2)	Kazakhstan	Harbin Sport University Student Skating Hall, Harbin; Attendance: 862

Game reference

Kim Yeon-ju
Goalies
Arina Chshyokolova
Referees:
(China) Song Meina
(Malaysia) Wan Mei Wah
Linesmen:
(South Korea) Park Jung-yoon
(China) Wang Hui

0–1	05:58 – PP1 – Aldabergenova (Shegay, Tursynova)
0–2	43:23 – Butorina
0–3	53:30 – EN – Moldabay

11 min
Penalties
10 min
23
Shots
22

== Short-track speed skating ==
Kazakhstan's short track speed skating team consists of ten athletes (six men and six women).

Men
- Adil Galiakhmetov
- Gleb Ivchenko
- Denis Nikisha
- Mersaid Zhaxybayev
- Abzal Azhgaliyev
- Aibek Nassen

Women
- Alina Azhgaliyeva
- Yana Khan
- Olga Tikhonova
- Malika Yermek
- Zeinep Kumarkan
- Madina Zhanbussinova

Men

Athlete	Event	Heat		Quarterfinal		Semifinal		Final	
Athlete	Event	Time	Rank	Time	Rank	Time	Rank	Time	Rank
Mersaid Zhaxybayev	500 m	41.871	1 Q	41.704	3	Did not advance			
Abzal Azhgaliyev	500 m	42.026	1 Q	41.876	2 Q	41.514	4 FB	42.571	8
Denis Nikisha	500 m	42.702	1 Q	41.129	2 Q	PEN		Did not advance	
Aibek Nassen	1000 m	1:32.155	2 Q	1:29.064	3	Did not advance			
Gleb Ivchenko	1000 m	1:40.338	1 Q	1:26.828	3 Q	1:26.794	3 FB	1:33.378	6
Adil Galiakhmetov	1000 m	1:29.468	1 Q	1:27.443	1 Q	1:26.234	3 FB	1:45.870	9
Gleb Ivchenko	1500 m	—		2:30.602	2 Q	2:32.129	5	Did not advance	
Adil Galiakhmetov	1500 m	—		2:29.920	1 Q	2:25.993	3 FB	2:29.565	8
Denis Nikisha	1500 m	—		2:16.863	2 Q	2:31.890	3 FB	Did not start	
Gleb Ivchenko; Denis Nikisha; Mersaid Zhaxybayev; Adil Galiakhmetov; Aibek Nassen^{[a]} Abzal Azhgaliyev^{[a]}	5000 m relay	—				6:55.242	2 FA	6:59.415	1st place, gold medalist(s)

Women

Athlete	Event	Heat		Quarterfinal		Semifinal		Final	
Athlete	Event	Time	Rank	Time	Rank	Time	Rank	Time	Rank
Zeinep Kumarkan	500 m	45.420	3 Q	44.577	3	Did not advance			
Yana Khan	500 m	43.929	3 Q	43.383	3 q	PEN		Did not advance	
Malika Yermek	500 m	44.286	2 Q	43.966	2 Q	43.994	3 FB	PEN	8
Olga Tikhonova	1000 m	1:40.731	2 Q	1:32.943	3	Did not advance			
Alina Azhgaliyeva	1000 m	1:35.431	4 q	1:32.235	2 Q	1:30.152	3 FB	1:36.884	7
Malika Yermek	1000 m	1:35.228	2 Q	1:32.306	3 q	1:33.771	4 ADVA	1:30.167	5
Alina Azhgaliyeva	1500 m	—		2:31.433	3 Q	2:25.091	4 FB	2:39.740	8
Madina Zhanbussinova	1500 m	—		2:35.696	3 Q	3:42.048	5 ADVB	2:40.318	10
Olga Tikhonova	1500 m	—		2:35.294	1 Q	No time		Did not advance	
Olga Tikhonova; Yana Khan; Alina Azhgaliyeva; Malika Yermek; Zeinep Kumarkan^{[a]} Madina Zhanbussinova^{[a]}	3000 m relay	—				4:14.268	2 FA	4:13.498	2nd place, silver medalist(s)

Mixed

Athlete	Event	Quarterfinal		Semifinal		Final	
Athlete	Event	Time	Rank	Time	Rank	Time	Rank
Yana Khan; Malika Yermek; Denis Nikisha; Adil Galiakhmetov; Alina Azhgaliyeva^{[a]} Olga Tikhonova^{[a]} Mersaid Zhaxybayev^{[a]} Abzal Azhgaliyev^{[a]}	2000 m relay	2:45.431	1 Q	2:46.491	2 FA	2:42.258	2nd place, silver medalist(s)

Qualification legend: FA - Qualify to medal final; FB - Qualify to consolation final ^{a} Skaters who participated in the heats only.

== Ski mountaineering ==
Team rooster

- Denis Vlassov
- Niyaz Janzakov
- Timur Artyukhin
- Shyngys Baikashev
- Assem Nazyrova

Athlete	Event	Qualification		Semifinals		Final	
Athlete	Event	Time	Rank	Time	Rank	Time	Rank
Niyaz Janzakov	Men's sprint	3:19.68	9 Q	3:25.23	5	Did not advance	
Denis Vlassov	Men's sprint	3:37.82	11 Q	3:41.14	5	Did not advance	
Shyngys Baikashev	Men's sprint	4:01.40	19	Did not advance			
Timur Artyukhin	Men's sprint	4:30.93	21	Did not advance			
Assem Nazyrova	Women's sprint	3:48.61	9 Q	3:45.75	4	Did not advance	
Assem Nazyrova; Niyaz Janzakov	Mixed relay	18:15.36	9 Q	—		36:43.77	8

== Speed skating ==
Men

Athlete	Event	Time	Rank
Yevgeniy Koshkin	100 m	9.47	2nd place, silver medalist(s)
Altay Zhardembekuly	100 m	9.64	4
Artur Galiyev	100 m	9.93	12
Nikita Vazhenin	100 m	10.01	15
Yevgeniy Koshkin	500 m	35.152	4
Altay Zhardembekuly	500 m	35.25	9
Nikita Vazhenin	500 m	36.19	15
Roman Binazarov	500 m	36.62	16
Altay Zhardembekuly	1000 m	1:10.90	9
Roman Binazarov	1000 m	1:11.58	11
Artur Galiyev	1000 m	1:11.78	14
Nikita Vazhenin	1000 m	1:15.00	16
Nuraly Akzhol	1500 m	1:50.98	8
Demyan Gavrilov	1500 m	1:51.08	9
Roman Binazarov	1500 m	1:51.20	10
Bakdaulet Sagatov	1500 m	1:52.72	15
Vadim Yakubovskiy	5000 m	6:47.49	9
Bakdaulet Sagatov	5000 m	6:53.77	12
Vitaliy Chshigolev	5000 m	6:53.89	13
Nuraly Akzhol; Vitaliy Chshigolev; Vadim Yakubovskiy	Team pursuit	3:57.43	4
Nikita Vazhenin; Artur Galiyev; Altay Zhardembekuly	Team sprint	1:23.05	4

Women

Athlete	Event	Time	Rank
Kristina Silaeva	100 m	10.73	8
Inessa Shumekova	100 m	10.82(9)	13
Margarita Galiyeva	100 m	11.10	14
Darya Vazhenina	100 m	11.23	15
Kristina Silaeva	500 m	39.11	8
Inessa Shumekova	500 m	39.67(6)	14
Darya Vazhenina	500 m	39.67(7)	15
Margarita Galiyeva	500 m	40.48	17
Nadezhda Morozova	1000 m	1:17.96	7
Darya Vazhenina	1000 m	1:19.01	10
Inessa Shumekova	1000 m	1:19.79	14
Arina Ilyachshenko	1000 m	1:22.49	16
Nadezhda Morozova	1500 m	2:00.97	8
Kristina Shumekova	1500 m	2:01.27	10
Mariya Degen	1500 m	2:05.05	14
Arina Ilyachshenko	1500 m	2:09.42	16
Nadezhda Morozova	3000 m	4:12.70	4
Kristina Shumekova	3000 m	4:17.08	6
Arina Ilyachshenko	3000 m	4:40.44	12
Mariya Degen; Nadezhda Morozova; Kristina Shumekova	Team pursuit	Disqualified	
Kristina Silaeva; Darya Vazhenina; Nadezhda Morozova	Team sprint	1:30.12	3rd place, bronze medalist(s)
