= Biathlon at the 2025 Asian Winter Games =

- Venue: Yabuli Ski Resort
- Dates: 11–13 February 2025
- Competitors: 65 from 10 nations

Biathlon competitions at the 2025 Asian Winter Games in Harbin, China, were held at Yabuli Ski Resort between 11 and 13 February 2025.

== Schedule ==
F	Final

Event↓/Date →	11th Tue	12th Wed	13th Thu
Men's 10 km sprint	F		
Men's 4 × 7.5 km relay			F
Women's 7.5 km sprint	F		
Women's 4 × 6 km relay			F

== Medalists ==
=== Men ===
Event	Gold	Silver	Bronze
10 km sprint	Vladislav Kireyev; Kazakhstan	Vadim Kurales; Kazakhstan	Gu Cang; China
4 × 7.5 km relay	Japan; Kiyomasa Ojima; Mikito Tachizaki; Masaharu Yamamoto; Tsukasa Kobonoki	Kazakhstan; Alexandr Mukhin; Asset Dyussenov; Kirill Bauer; Vladislav Kireyev	China; Hu Weiyao; Wu Hantu; Yan Xingyuan; Gu Cang

=== Women ===
Event	Gold	Silver	Bronze
7.5 km sprint	Ekaterina Avvakumova; South Korea	Meng Fanqi; China	Tang Jialin; China
4 × 6 km relay	China; Tang Jialin; Wen Ying; Chu Yuanmeng; Meng Fanqi	South Korea; Ko Eun-jung; Ekaterina Avvakumova; Mariya Abe; Jung Ju-mi	Kazakhstan; Olga Poltoranina; Darya Klimina; Arina Kryukova; Yelizaveta Beletskaya

== Medal table ==
Rank	Nation	Gold	Silver	Bronze	Total
1	Kazakhstan (KAZ)	1	2	1	4
2	China (CHN)	1	1	3	5
3	South Korea (KOR)	1	1	0	2
4	Japan (JPN)	1	0	0	1
Totals (4 entries)		4	4	4	12

== Participating nations ==
A total of 65 athletes from 10 nations competed in biathlon at the 2025 Asian Winter Games:

- China (10)
- Chinese Taipei (1)
- Japan (9)
- Kazakhstan (10)
- Kyrgyzstan (7)
- Lebanon (4)
- Mongolia (8)
- South Korea (9)
- Thailand (5)
- Uzbekistan (2)
