= Cross-country skiing at the 2025 Asian Winter Games – Women's 4 × 5 kilometre relay =

Women's 4 × 5 kilometre relay at the 2025 Asian Winter Games
- Venue: Yabuli Ski Resort
- Dates: 12 February 2025
- Competitors: 24 from 6 nations

Medalists
gold medal	China; Li Lei, Chi Chunxue, Chen Lingshuang, Dinigeer Yilamujiang
silver medal	Kazakhstan; Xeniya Shalygina, Kamila Yelgazinova, Angelina Shuryga, Nadezhda Stepashkina
bronze medal	Japan; Mayu Yamamoto, Chika Kobayashi, Yuka Yamazaki, Karen Hatakeyama

The women's 4 × 5 kilometre relay at the 2025 Asian Winter Games was held on 12 February 2025 at Yabuli Ski Resort in Harbin, China.

== Schedule ==
All times are China Standard Time (UTC+08:00)

Date	Time	Event
Wednesday, 12 February 2025	11:00	Final

== Results ==
Rank	Team	Time
1st place, gold medalist(s)	China (CHN)	53:59.3
	Li Lei	14:30.6
	Chi Chunxue	14:17.3
	Chen Lingshuang	12:24.6
	Dinigeer Yilamujiang	12:46.8
2nd place, silver medalist(s)	Kazakhstan (KAZ)	55:24.5
	Xeniya Shalygina	14:34.6
	Kamila Yelgazinova	15:00.3
	Angelina Shuryga	12:46.1
	Nadezhda Stepashkina	13:03.5
3rd place, bronze medalist(s)	Japan (JPN)	56:38.1
	Mayu Yamamoto	15:43.2
	Chika Kobayashi	14:17.1
	Yuka Yamazaki	12:51.4
	Karen Hatakeyama	13:46.4
4	South Korea (KOR)	57:14.4
	Lee Eui-jin	14:36.4
	Je Sang-mi	15:25.1
	Lee Ji-ye	13:43.0
	Han Da-som	13:29.9
5	Mongolia (MGL)	1:01:23.1
	Enkhbayaryn Ariuntungalag	15:43.6
	Ariunsanaagiin Enkhtuul	17:01.7
	Tömöriin Ariunbold	14:04.9
	Barsnyamyn Nomin-Erdene	14:32.9
6	Iran (IRI)	1:09:41.0
	Samaneh Beyrami Baher	17:08.5
	Sahel Tir	19:08.4
	Farnoush Shemshaki	16:36.2
	Atefeh Salehi	16:47.9
