= Biathlon at the 2025 Asian Winter Games – Men's sprint =

Men's 10 kilometre sprint at the 2025 Asian Winter Games
- Venue: Yabuli Ski Resort
- Dates: 11 February 2025
- Competitors: 33 from 10 nations

Medalists
gold medal	Vladislav Kireyev	Kazakhstan
silver medal	Vadim Kurales	Kazakhstan
bronze medal	Gu Cang	China

The men's 10 kilometre sprint at the 2025 Asian Winter Games was held on 11 February 2025 at Yabuli Ski Resort in Harbin, China.

== Schedule ==
All times are China Standard Time (UTC+08:00)

Date	Time	Event
Tuesday, 11 February 2025	13:00	Final

== Results ==
Legend

- DNS — Did not start
- DSQ — Disqualified

Rank	Athlete	Penalties			Time
Rank	Athlete	P	S	Total	Time
1st place, gold medalist(s)	Vladislav Kireyev (KAZ)	1	0	1	29:47.4
2nd place, silver medalist(s)	Vadim Kurales (KAZ)	0	2	2	30:13.1
3rd place, bronze medalist(s)	Gu Cang (CHN)	0	1	1	30:17.1
4	Yan Xingyuan (CHN)	1	2	3	30:18.0
5	Masaharu Yamamoto (JPN)	0	3	3	30:39.8
6	Asset Dyussenov (KAZ)	1	2	3	30:40.6
7	Alexandr Mukhin (KAZ)	2	3	5	31:03.8
8	Kiyomasa Ojima (JPN)	2	3	5	31:09.1
9	Tsukasa Kobonoki (JPN)	2	3	5	31:27.9
10	Choi Du-jin (KOR)	1	2	3	31:45.1
11	Hu Weiyao (CHN)	1	2	3	32:02.3
12	Enkhbatyn Enkhsaikhan (MGL)	2	0	2	32:10.3
13	Kang Yoon-jae (KOR)	0	1	1	32:20.5
14	Song Chen (CHN)	3	2	5	32:27.3
15	Boldbaataryn Ankhbold (MGL)	1	0	1	32:52.0
16	Heo Seon-hoe (KOR)	1	1	2	32:57.9
17	Kim Seong-yun (KOR)	3	2	5	33:30.2
18	Jargalyn Gantulga (MGL)	1	1	2	33:52.7
19	Artur Saparbekov (KGZ)	3	0	3	35:28.3
20	Mark Chanloung (THA)	4	5	9	35:57.8
21	Musa Rakhmanberdi Uulu (KGZ)	1	0	1	36:16.1
22	Thanakorn Ngoeichai (THA)	0	3	3	36:57.2
23	Otgondavaagiin Gantulga (MGL)	2	2	4	37:04.5
24	Eldar Kadyrov (KGZ)	3	3	6	37:23.3
25	Rolan Raimkulov (UZB)	3	3	6	40:22.2
26	Fan Ruei-hong (TPE)	5	0	5	43:51.6
27	Nurislam Zhumaliev (KGZ)	5	2	7	44:28.3
28	Elie Tawk (LBN)	3	3	6	45:15.2
29	Paul Kayrouz (LBN)	4	5	9	47:10.5
30	Kitsakorn Kingsakul (THA)	5	5	10	50:10.6
31	Dilmurod Abdurakhmonov (UZB)	2	1	3	51:15.4
—	Naravich Saisuk (THA)				DSQ
—	Mikito Tachizaki (JPN)				DNS
