= Curling at the 2025 Asian Winter Games – Women's team =

Women's team at the 2025 Asian Winter Games
- Venue: Pingfang Curling Arena
- Date: 9–14 February 2025
- Competitors: 45 from 9 nations

Medalists
gold medal	South Korea; Gim Eun-ji, Kim Min-ji, Kim Su-ji, Seol Ye-eun, Seol Ye-ji
silver medal	China; Wang Rui, Han Yu, Dong Ziqi, Jiang Jiayi, Su Tingyu
bronze medal	Japan; Yuina Miura, Suzune Yasui, Yuna Sakuma, Ai Matsunaga, Hana Ikeda

The women's team curling tournament at the 2025 Asian Winter Games was held in Harbin, China, between 9 and 14 February at the Harbin Pingfang District Curling Arena.

A total of 9 teams participated in the tournament.

== Squads ==
China	Chinese Taipei	Hong Kong	Japan
Wang Rui; Han Yu; Dong Ziqi; Jiang Jiayi; Su Tingyu	Yang Ko; Lee Yi-chun; Liu I-ling; Chang Chia-chi; Chou Yi-hsuan	Hung Ling Yue; Ada Shang; Hu Pianpian; Chan Ka; Wong Yuen Ting	Yuina Miura; Suzune Yasui; Yuna Sakuma; Ai Matsunaga; Hana Ikeda
Kazakhstan	Philippines	Qatar	South Korea
Tilsimay Alliyarova; Yekaterina Kolykhalova; Merey Tastemir; Angelina Ebauyer; Regina Ebauyer	Kathleen Dubberstein; Leilani Dubberstein; Sheila Mariano; Anne Marie Bonache; Jennifer de la Fuente	Amna Al-Qaet; Fatima Al-Fahad; Haseena Al-Fahad; Aldana Al-Fahad; Sara Al-Qaet	Gim Eun-ji; Kim Min-ji; Kim Su-ji; Seol Ye-eun; Seol Ye-ji
Thailand			
Phichayathida Jaosap; Nattida Kumpeerakit; Supakan Kaewmorakot; Kanya Natchanarong; Wanvisa Punyaneramitdee			

== Results ==
All times are China Standard Time (UTC+08:00)

=== Round robin ===
Pos	Team	Skip	Pld	W	L	W–L	PF	PA	DSC	Qualification
1	South Korea	Gim Eun-ji	8	8	0	—	63	14	45.90	Semifinals
2	China	Wang Rui	8	7	1	—	85	21	38.69	Semifinals
3	Japan	Yuina Miura	8	6	2	—	68	30	58.25	Semifinals
4	Kazakhstan	Angelina Ebauyer	8	5	3	—	55	39	54.81	Semifinals
5	Philippines	Kathleen Dubberstein	8	4	4	—	61	36	85.56	
6	Hong Kong	Hung Ling Yue	8	3	5	—	44	45	115.69	
7	Chinese Taipei	Yang Ko	8	2	6	—	29	75	107.27	
8	Thailand	Phichayathida Jaosap	8	1	7	—	19	91	128.48	
9	Qatar	Amna Al-Qaet	8	0	8	—	11	84	180.65	

Source: Official website

9 February, 9:00

Sheet A	1	2	3	4	5	6	7	8	Final
Chinese Taipei	0	0	0	0	0	0	X	X	0
South Korea 🔨	2	2	2	3	1	1	X	X	11

Sheet B	1	2	3	4	5	6	7	8	Final
Philippines 🔨	1	1	3	1	0	1	0	X	7
Hong Kong	0	0	0	0	1	0	1	X	2

Sheet C	1	2	3	4	5	6	7	8	Final
China 🔨	3	7	5	2	2	0	X	X	19
Thailand	0	0	0	0	0	1	X	X	1

Sheet D	1	2	3	4	5	6	7	8	Final
Kazakhstan	0	2	0	1	0	1	0	X	4
Japan 🔨	3	0	3	0	3	0	1	X	10

9 February, 17:00

Sheet A	1	2	3	4	5	6	7	8	Final
Thailand	1	0	0	1	0	1	0	X	3
Hong Kong 🔨	0	1	3	0	3	0	2	X	9

Sheet B	1	2	3	4	5	6	7	8	Final
South Korea 🔨	1	0	0	2	1	0	2	X	6
Japan	0	0	1	0	0	3	0	X	4

Sheet C	1	2	3	4	5	6	7	8	Final
Qatar	0	0	0	1	0	0	X	X	1
Philippines 🔨	0	5	2	0	5	1	X	X	13

Sheet D	1	2	3	4	5	6	7	8	Final
China 🔨	8	0	2	3	0	1	X	X	14
Chinese Taipei	0	1	0	0	1	0	X	X	2

10 February, 9:00

Sheet A	1	2	3	4	5	6	7	8	Final
Japan 🔨	1	0	0	2	1	1	1	X	6
Philippines	0	2	2	0	0	0	0	X	4

Sheet B	1	2	3	4	5	6	7	8	Final
Qatar 🔨	0	0	0	0	0	0	X	X	0
China	3	4	2	3	2	0	X	X	14

Sheet C	1	2	3	4	5	6	7	8	Final
Chinese Taipei 🔨	0	0	0	0	0	0	X	X	0
Kazakhstan	3	0	1	4	1	5	X	X	14

Sheet E	1	2	3	4	5	6	7	8	Final
Thailand	0	0	0	0	0	0	X	X	0
South Korea 🔨	5	2	2	2	2	1	X	X	14

10 February, 19:00

Sheet A	1	2	3	4	5	6	7	8	Final
China 🔨	3	2	0	3	1	0	2	X	11
Kazakhstan	0	0	2	0	0	2	0	X	4

Sheet B	1	2	3	4	5	6	7	8	Final
Chinese Taipei 🔨	3	0	2	0	1	1	3	X	10
Thailand	0	1	0	1	0	0	0	X	2

Sheet C	1	2	3	4	5	6	7	8	Final
South Korea 🔨	1	0	1	1	3	3	0	X	9
Hong Kong	0	1	0	0	0	0	1	X	2

Sheet D	1	2	3	4	5	6	7	8	Final
Japan 🔨	2	1	0	3	5	1	X	X	12
Qatar	0	0	1	0	0	0	X	X	1

11 February, 9:00

Sheet B	1	2	3	4	5	6	7	8	Final
Kazakhstan 🔨	0	2	0	1	1	0	0	1	5
Philippines	1	0	1	0	0	1	1	0	4

Sheet C	1	2	3	4	5	6	7	8	Final
Thailand	0	1	0	0	1	0	X	X	2
Japan 🔨	4	0	2	4	0	3	X	X	13

Sheet D	1	2	3	4	5	6	7	8	Final
Hong Kong	0	0	0	0	2	1	0	X	3
China 🔨	2	1	2	1	0	0	3	X	9

Sheet E	1	2	3	4	5	6	7	8	Final
Qatar	0	0	0	1	4	0	X	X	5
Chinese Taipei 🔨	3	4	1	0	0	1	X	X	9

11 February, 19:00

Sheet B	1	2	3	4	5	6	7	8	Final
China 🔨	0	1	1	0	0	0	1	0	3
South Korea	0	0	0	1	1	1	0	1	4

Sheet C	1	2	3	4	5	6	7	8	Final
Kazakhstan 🔨	0	0	3	4	1	3	X	X	11
Qatar	1	1	0	0	0	0	X	X	2

Sheet D	1	2	3	4	5	6	7	8	Final
Philippines 🔨	1	2	5	2	1	5	X	X	16
Thailand	0	0	0	0	0	0	X	X	0

Sheet E	1	2	3	4	5	6	7	8	Final
Hong Kong	0	0	0	0	2	0	0	X	2
Japan 🔨	2	1	1	2	0	1	2	X	9

12 February, 9:00

Sheet B	1	2	3	4	5	6	7	8	Final
Thailand 🔨	0	1	1	1	1	4	2	X	10
Qatar	1	0	0	0	0	0	0	X	1

Sheet C	1	2	3	4	5	6	7	8	Final
Hong Kong 🔨	1	1	2	2	1	0	1	X	8
Chinese Taipei	0	0	0	0	0	1	0	X	1

Sheet D	1	2	3	4	5	6	7	8	Final
South Korea	2	0	3	0	2	1	X	X	8
Kazakhstan 🔨	0	1	0	1	0	0	X	X	2

Sheet E	1	2	3	4	5	6	7	8	Final
Philippines	0	1	0	2	0	1	1	X	5
China 🔨	3	0	2	0	4	0	0	X	9

12 February, 19:00

Sheet B	1	2	3	4	5	6	7	8	Final
Japan	5	1	0	2	0	0	4	X	12
Chinese Taipei 🔨	0	0	1	0	4	0	0	X	5

Sheet C	1	2	3	4	5	6	7	8	Final
Philippines	0	2	0	0	1	0	X	X	3
South Korea 🔨	2	0	4	3	0	2	X	X	11

Sheet D	1	2	3	4	5	6	7	8	Final
Qatar	1	0	0	0	0	0	X	X	1
Hong Kong 🔨	0	5	4	2	1	3	X	X	15

Sheet E	1	2	3	4	5	6	7	8	Final
Kazakhstan 🔨	0	2	1	1	3	2	X	X	9
Thailand	1	0	0	0	0	0	X	X	1

13 February, 9:00

Sheet A	1	2	3	4	5	6	7	8	Final
South Korea 🔨	4	1							W
Qatar	0	0							L

- Qatar forfeited the game after end 2 as they did not have enough remaining members to continue to play.

Sheet B	1	2	3	4	5	6	7	8	Final
Hong Kong	0	1	0	2	0	0	0	X	3
Kazakhstan 🔨	0	0	2	0	1	3	0	X	6

Sheet C	1	2	3	4	5	6	7	8	Final
Japan	0	1	0	0	0	1	0	0	2
China 🔨	0	0	0	1	2	0	2	1	6

Sheet D	1	2	3	4	5	6	7	8	Final
Chinese Taipei	0	0	1	0	1	0	0	X	2
Philippines 🔨	2	2	0	3	0	1	1	X	9

=== Knockout round ===
Semifinals
1	South Korea	10
4	Kazakhstan	2
2	China	5
3	Japan	2

Gold medal game
1	South Korea	7
2	China	2
Bronze medal game
4	Kazakhstan	3
3	Japan	6

==== Semifinals ====
13 February, 19:00

Sheet B	1	2	3	4	5	6	7	8	Final
China 🔨	1	0	0	1	0	1	2	X	5
Japan	0	0	0	0	2	0	0	X	2

Sheet C	1	2	3	4	5	6	7	8	Final
Kazakhstan	0	1	0	1	0	0	X	X	2
South Korea 🔨	5	0	3	0	1	1	X	X	10

==== Bronze medal game ====
14 February, 13:00

Sheet B	1	2	3	4	5	6	7	8	Final
Kazakhstan	0	0	0	2	0	0	1	X	3
Japan 🔨	0	1	1	0	3	1	0	X	6

==== Gold medal game ====
14 February, 13:00

Sheet C	1	2	3	4	5	6	7	8	Final
China	0	0	2	0	0	0	0	X	2
South Korea 🔨	1	2	0	1	0	1	2	X	7

== Final standing ==
Rank	Team	Pld	W	L
1st place, gold medalist(s)	South Korea	10	10	0
2nd place, silver medalist(s)	China	10	8	2
3rd place, bronze medalist(s)	Japan	10	7	3
4	Kazakhstan	10	5	5
5	Philippines	8	4	4
6	Hong Kong	8	3	5
7	Chinese Taipei	8	2	6
8	Thailand	8	1	7
9	Qatar	8	0	8
