= Curling at the 2025 Asian Winter Games – Mixed doubles =

Mixed doubles at the 2025 Asian Winter Games
- Venue: Pingfang Curling Arena
- Date: 4–8 February 2025
- Competitors: 24 from 12 nations

Medalists
gold medal	Tori Koana; Go Aoki	Japan
silver medal	Kim Kyeong-ae; Seong Ji-hoon	South Korea
bronze medal	Han Yu; Wang Zhiyu	China

The mixed doubles curling tournament at the 2025 Asian Winter Games was held in Harbin, China, between 4 and 8 February at the Harbin Pingfang District Curling Arena. A total of 12 teams participated in the tournament.

Teams had one male and one female thrower, with one curler throwing rocks #1 and #5 and the other throwing rocks #2, #3 and #4.

== Squads ==
China	Chinese Taipei	Hong Kong	Japan
Han Yu; Wang Zhiyu	Chou Yi-hsuan; Liu Bor-kai	Hung Ling Yue; Martin Yan	Tori Koana; Go Aoki
Kazakhstan	Kuwait	Kyrgyzstan	Mongolia
Amina Seitzhanova; Azizbek Nadirbayev	Fatema Abdulateef; Saud Al-Kandari	Keremet Asanbaeva; Iskhak Abykeev	Ganbatyn Enkhzayaa; Bulgankhüügiin Bayar
Philippines	Qatar	South Korea	Thailand
Kathleen Dubberstein; Marc Pfister	Mubarka Al-Abdulla; Nasser Al-Yafei	Kim Kyeong-ae; Seong Ji-hoon	Chanatip Sonkham; Teekawin Jearateerawit

== Results ==
All times are China Standard Time (UTC+08:00)

=== Round robin ===
==== Group A ====
Pos	Team	Athletes	Pld	W	L	W–L	PF	PA	DSC	Qualification
1	Japan	Koana / Aoki	5	5	0	—	49	8	57.23	Semifinals
2	Hong Kong	Hung / Yan	5	4	1	—	46	26	56.68	Qualification
3	Chinese Taipei	Chou / Liu	5	3	2	—	44	25	65.56	Qualification
4	Thailand	Sonkham / Jearateerawit	5	2	3	—	29	46	142.12	
5	Kuwait	Abdulateef / Al-Kandari	5	1	4	—	14	41	197.23	
6	Mongolia	Enkhzayaa / Bayar	5	0	5	—	16	52	134.74	

Source: Official website

4 February, 10:00

Sheet A	1	2	3	4	5	6	7	8	Final
Kuwait	1	0	2	0	1	1	0	1	6
Mongolia	0	1	0	3	0	0	1	0	5

Sheet E	1	2	3	4	5	6	7	8	Final
Japan	0	3	2	2	0	3	2	X	12
Thailand	1	0	0	0	1	0	0	X	2

4 February, 14:00

Sheet B	1	2	3	4	5	6	7	8	Final
Thailand	0	1	4	1	0	4	2	X	12
Kuwait	1	0	0	0	2	0	0	X	3

Sheet C	1	2	3	4	5	6	7	8	Final
Hong Kong	3	0	2	0	3	1	0	0	9
Chinese Taipei	0	4	0	1	0	0	2	1	8

Sheet D	1	2	3	4	5	6	7	8	Final
Mongolia	0	0	0	0	0	0	X	X	0
Japan	5	4	1	3	5	1	X	X	19

5 February, 10:00

Sheet B	1	2	3	4	5	6	7	8	Final
Japan	1	1	2	1	1	0	3	X	9
Hong Kong	0	0	0	0	0	3	0	X	3

Sheet E	1	2	3	4	5	6	7	8	Final
Chinese Taipei	2	0	5	2	0	0	4	X	13
Kuwait	0	1	0	0	1	1	0	X	3

5 February, 14:00

Sheet B	1	2	3	4	5	6	7	8	Final
Mongolia	2	0	0	0	1	0	1	X	4
Chinese Taipei	0	4	2	1	0	1	0	X	8

Sheet D	1	2	3	4	5	6	7	8	Final
Kuwait	0	0	1	0	0	0	1	X	2
Hong Kong	5	1	0	1	2	2	0	X	11

5 February, 18:00

Sheet C	1	2	3	4	5	6	7	8	Final
Mongolia	1	0	2	0	0	2	0	X	5
Thailand	0	3	0	2	1	0	4	X	10

6 February, 10:00

Sheet A	1	2	3	4	5	6	7	8	Final
Chinese Taipei	1	0	0	0	0	2	X	X	3
Japan	0	2	2	2	3	0	X	X	9

6 February, 14:00

Sheet A	1	2	3	4	5	6	7	8	Final
Thailand	1	0	1	3	0	0	0	X	5
Hong Kong	0	4	0	0	5	2	3	X	14

Sheet C	1	2	3	4	5	6	7	8	Final
Japan	5	5							W
Kuwait	0	0							L

- Kuwait forfeited the game after end 2 as a player was feeling unwell and could not continue to play.

6 February, 18:00

Sheet D	1	2	3	4	5	6	7	8	Final
Chinese Taipei	1	2	4	2	1	2	X	X	12
Thailand	0	0	0	0	0	0	X	X	0

Sheet E	1	2	3	4	5	6	7	8	Final
Hong Kong	1	0	4	1	0	2	1	X	9
Mongolia	0	1	0	0	1	0	0	X	2

==== Group B ====
Pos	Team	Athletes	Pld	W	L	W–L	PF	PA	DSC	Qualification
1	China	Han / Wang	5	5	0	—	44	19	37.46	Semifinals
2	Philippines	Dubberstein / Pfister	5	4	1	—	50	22	58.24	Qualification
3	South Korea	Kim / Seong	5	3	2	—	50	22	47.83	Qualification
4	Kazakhstan	Seitzhanova / Nadirbayev	5	2	3	—	26	43	55.33	
5	Kyrgyzstan	Asanbaeva / Abykeev	5	1	4	—	21	50	114.23	
6	Qatar	Al-Abdulla / Al-Yafei	5	0	5	—	15	50	98.31	

Source: Official website

4 February, 10:00

Sheet B	1	2	3	4	5	6	7	8	Final
Qatar	1	0	0	4	0	0	0	1	6
Kyrgyzstan	0	4	1	0	1	1	1	0	8

Sheet C	1	2	3	4	5	6	7	8	Final
China	1	2	0	3	4	0	1	X	11
Kazakhstan	0	0	1	0	0	4	0	X	5

Sheet D	1	2	3	4	5	6	7	8	Final
Philippines	5	0	2	0	0	0	5	X	12
South Korea	0	1	0	1	3	1	0	X	6

4 February, 14:00

Sheet A	1	2	3	4	5	6	7	8	Final
Kyrgyzstan	0	0	1	0	0	1	0	X	2
Philippines	3	1	0	1	1	0	4	X	10

Sheet E	1	2	3	4	5	6	7	8	Final
South Korea	1	2	3	0	5	3	X	X	14
Qatar	0	0	0	1	0	0	X	X	1

5 February, 10:00

Sheet A	1	2	3	4	5	6	7	8	Final
Kazakhstan	0	0	0	0	0	0	X	X	0
South Korea	6	1	1	2	1	1	X	X	12

Sheet C	1	2	3	4	5	6	7	8	Final
Philippines	0	3	3	1	3	1	X	X	11
Qatar	3	0	0	0	0	0	X	X	3

Sheet D	1	2	3	4	5	6	7	8	Final
Kyrgyzstan	0	1	0	0	2	0	0	X	3
China	1	0	2	2	0	1	2	X	8

5 February, 18:00

Sheet D	1	2	3	4	5	6	7	8	Final
Kazakhstan	1	2	0	1	1	1	0	1	7
Qatar	0	0	2	0	0	0	2	0	4

Sheet E	1	2	3	4	5	6	7	8	Final
China	4	2	1	1	0	1	0	X	9
Philippines	0	0	0	0	3	0	3	X	6

6 February, 10:00

Sheet B	1	2	3	4	5	6	7	8	Final
South Korea	1	0	1	0	1	0	1	X	4
China	0	2	0	1	0	3	0	X	6

Sheet E	1	2	3	4	5	6	7	8	Final
Kazakhstan	1	0	3	3	0	4	1	X	12
Kyrgyzstan	0	2	0	0	3	0	0	X	5

6 February, 18:00

Sheet A	1	2	3	4	5	6	7	8	Final
Qatar	0	0	0	0	0	1	X	X	1
China	4	3	1	1	1	0	X	X	10

Sheet B	1	2	3	4	5	6	7	8	Final
Philippines	2	4	1	1	1	0	2	X	11
Kazakhstan	0	0	0	0	0	2	0	X	2

Sheet C	1	2	3	4	5	6	7	8	Final
South Korea	0	3	5	1	0	3	2	X	14
Kyrgyzstan	1	0	0	0	2	0	0	X	3

=== Knockout round ===
Qualification
A3	Chinese Taipei	2
B2	Philippines	7
A2	Hong Kong	4
B3	South Korea	11

Semifinals
A1	Japan	10
B2	Philippines	3
B1	China	4
B3	South Korea	8

Gold medal game
A1	Japan	7
B3	South Korea	6
Bronze medal game
B2	Philippines	5
B1	China	6

==== Qualification ====
7 February, 9:00

Sheet B	1	2	3	4	5	6	7	8	Final
Hong Kong	0	0	0	3	0	1	0	X	4
South Korea	1	3	2	0	2	0	3	X	11

Sheet C	1	2	3	4	5	6	7	8	Final
Philippines	0	1	0	1	2	1	2	X	7
Chinese Taipei	1	0	1	0	0	0	0	X	2

==== Semifinals ====
7 February, 13:00

Sheet B	1	2	3	4	5	6	7	8	Final
Philippines	0	2	0	0	1	0	X	X	3
Japan	2	0	4	1	0	3	X	X	10

Sheet C	1	2	3	4	5	6	7	8	Final
China	0	2	0	0	0	2	0	0	4
South Korea	1	0	3	1	1	0	1	1	8

==== Bronze medal game ====
8 February, 9:00

Sheet B	1	2	3	4	5	6	7	8	Final
Philippines	1	3	0	0	0	0	0	1	5
China	0	0	1	2	1	1	1	0	6

==== Gold medal game ====
8 February, 9:00

Sheet C	1	2	3	4	5	6	7	8	Final
South Korea	2	0	1	0	0	1	2	0	6
Japan	0	2	0	2	1	0	0	2	7

== Final standing ==
Rank	Team	Pld	W	L
1st place, gold medalist(s)	Japan	7	7	0
2nd place, silver medalist(s)	South Korea	8	5	3
3rd place, bronze medalist(s)	China	7	6	1
4	Philippines	8	5	3
5	Chinese Taipei	6	3	3
5	Hong Kong	6	4	2
7	Kazakhstan	5	2	3
8	Thailand	5	2	3
9	Kyrgyzstan	5	1	4
10	Kuwait	5	1	4
11	Qatar	5	0	5
12	Mongolia	5	0	5
