= Figure skating at the 2025 Asian Winter Games – Men's singles =

Men's singles at the 2025 Asian Winter Games
- Venue: Heilongjiang Multifunctional Hall
- Dates: 11–13 February 2025
- Competitors: 16 from 10 nations

Medalists
gold medal	Cha Jun-hwan	South Korea
silver medal	Yuma Kagiyama	Japan
bronze medal	Mikhail Shaidorov	Kazakhstan

The men's singles event at the 2025 Asian Winter Games was held on 11 and 13 February 2025 at the Heilongjiang Ice Events Training Centre Multifunctional Hall in Harbin, China.

== Schedule ==
All times are China Standard Time (UTC+08:00)

Date	Time	Event
Tuesday, 11 February 2025	17:00	Short program
Thursday, 13 February 2025	17:30	Free skating

== Results ==
Legend

- WD — Withdrawn

Rank	Athlete	SP	FS	Total
1st place, gold medalist(s)	Cha Jun-hwan (KOR)	94.09	187.60	281.69
2nd place, silver medalist(s)	Yuma Kagiyama (JPN)	103.81	168.95	272.76
3rd place, bronze medalist(s)	Mikhail Shaidorov (KAZ)	76.75	169.26	246.01
4	Dai Daiwei (CHN)	82.89	155.94	238.83
5	Shun Sato (JPN)	70.02	162.08	232.10
6	Ro Yong-myong (PRK)	68.51	136.65	205.16
7	Chen Yudong (CHN)	67.52	135.80	203.32
8	Li Yu-hsiang (TPE)	57.38	129.88	187.26
9	Dias Jirenbayev (KAZ)	65.56	120.62	186.18
10	Paolo Borromeo (PHI)	61.11	117.85	178.96
11	Jarke Zhao (HKG)	54.52	102.50	157.02
12	Lincoln Yuen (HKG)	54.24	101.38	155.62
13	Fang Ze Zeng (MAS)	51.49	94.71	146.20
14	Low Chun Hong (MAS)	26.75	58.17	84.92
15	Manjesh Tiwari (IND)	28.15	48.26	76.41
—	Kim Hyun-gyeom (KOR)	58.22		WD
