= Speed skating at the 2025 Asian Winter Games – Men's 100 metres =

Men's 100 metres at the 2025 Asian Winter Games
- Venue: Heilongjiang Speed Skating Hall
- Dates: 8 February 2025
- Competitors: 22 from 8 nations

Medalists
gold medal	Gao Tingyu	China
silver medal	Yevgeniy Koshkin	Kazakhstan
bronze medal	Kim Jun-ho	South Korea

The men's 100 metres competition in speed skating at the 2025 Asian Winter Games was held on 8 February 2025 in Harbin, China.

== Schedule ==
All times are China Standard Time (UTC+08:00)

Date	Time	Event
Saturday, 8 February 2025	12:00	Final

== Records ==
Prior to this competition, the existing world and Games records were as follows.

World Record	—	—	—	—
Games Record	Yuya Oikawa (JPN)	9.59	Changchun, China	31 January 2007

== Results ==
Rank	Pair	Athlete	Time	Notes
1st place, gold medalist(s)	11	Gao Tingyu (CHN)	9.35	GR
2nd place, silver medalist(s)	10	Yevgeniy Koshkin (KAZ)	9.47	
3rd place, bronze medalist(s)	11	Kim Jun-ho (KOR)	9.62	
4	8	Altay Zhardembekuly (KAZ)	9.64	
5	10	Wataru Morishige (JPN)	9.67	
6	6	Xue Zhiwen (CHN)	9.71	
7	5	Liu Bin (CHN)	9.802	
8	9	Yamato Matsui (JPN)	9.804	
9	6	Kim Tae-yun (KOR)	9.81	
10	8	Katsuhiro Kuratsubo (JPN)	9.82	
11	9	Cho Sang-hyeok (KOR)	9.84	
12	3	Artur Galiyev (KAZ)	9.93	
13	4	Koo Kyung-min (KOR)	9.95	
14	7	Tai Wei-lin (TPE)	9.99	
15	4	Nikita Vazhenin (KAZ)	10.01	
16	7	Lian Ziwen (CHN)	10.04	
17	5	Chandra Mouli Danda (IND)	10.83	
18	2	Sidney Chu (HKG)	10.94	
19	1	Omkara Yogaraj (IND)	10.99	
20	2	Srivatsa Srikantha Rao (IND)	11.10	
21	1	Anubhav Gupta (IND)	11.59	
22	3	Nopphaket Suansuk (THA)	11.79	
