= Short-track speed skating at the 2025 Asian Winter Games – Women's 1500 metres =

Women's 1500 metres at the 2025 Asian Winter Games
- Venue: Heilongjiang Multifunctional Hall
- Dates: 7–8 February 2025
- Competitors: 25 from 11 nations

Medalists
gold medal	Kim Gil-li	South Korea
silver medal	Gong Li	China
bronze medal	Zang Yize	China

The women's 1500 metres competition in short-track speed skating at the 2025 Asian Winter Games was held on 7 and 8 February 2025 in Harbin, China.

== Schedule ==
All times are China Standard Time (UTC+08:00)

Date	Time	Event
Friday, 7 February 2025	09:00	Quarterfinals
Saturday, 8 February 2025	10:28	Semifinals
Saturday, 8 February 2025	11:13	Finals

== Results ==
Legend

- ADV — Advanced
- DNS — Did not start
- PEN — Penalty

=== Quarterfinals ===
- Qualification: 1–3 + Three best 4 → Semifinals (Q + q)

==== Heat 1 ====
Rank	Athlete	Time	Notes
1	Gong Li (CHN)	2:30.820	Q
2	Haruna Nagamori (JPN)	2:31.191	Q
3	Alina Azhgaliyeva (KAZ)	2:31.433	Q
4	Amelia Chua (SGP)	2:45.691	
—	Ashley Chin (MAS)	DNS	

==== Heat 2 ====
Rank	Athlete	Time	Notes
1	Kim Gil-li (KOR)	2:43.771	Q
2	Thanutchaya Chatthaisong (THA)	2:43.975	Q
3	Alyssa Pok (SGP)	2:46.217	Q
4	Nicole Law (HKG)	2:52.174	
5	Suvarnika Radhakrishnan (IND)	3:04.736	

==== Heat 3 ====
Rank	Athlete	Time	Notes
1	Choi Min-jeong (KOR)	2:31.808	Q
2	Lam Ching Yan (HKG)	2:34.118	Q
3	Battulgyn Gereltuyaa (MGL)	2:38.674	Q
4	Chang Wan-ting (TPE)	2:40.363	q
5	Sai Sahana (IND)	2:56.634	

==== Heat 4 ====
Rank	Athlete	Time	Notes
1	Yang Jingru (CHN)	2:34.800	Q
2	Shim Suk-hee (KOR)	2:34.927	Q
3	Madina Zhanbussinova (KAZ)	2:35.696	Q
4	Miyu Miyashita (JPN)	2:36.513	q
5	Chung Hsiao-ying (TPE)	2:40.952	

==== Heat 5 ====
Rank	Athlete	Time	Notes
1	Olga Tikhonova (KAZ)	2:35.294	Q
2	Zang Yize (CHN)	2:35.398	Q
3	Riho Inuzuka (JPN)	2:35.544	Q
4	Punpreeda Prempreecha (THA)	2:39.076	q
5	Raina Kukreja (IND)	3:17.216	

=== Semifinals ===
- Qualification: 1–2 + Best 3 → Final A (QA), Next best seven → Final B (QB)

==== Heat 1 ====
Rank	Athlete	Time	Notes
1	Gong Li (CHN)	2:42.802	QA
2	Haruna Nagamori (JPN)	2:43.225	QA
3	Chang Wan-ting (TPE)	2:48.594	QB
4	Lam Ching Yan (HKG)	3:07.998	QB
5	Madina Zhanbussinova (KAZ)	3:42.048	ADVB
—	Riho Inuzuka (JPN)	PEN	

==== Heat 2 ====
Rank	Athlete	Time	Notes
1	Choi Min-jeong (KOR)	2:23.351	QA
2	Kim Gil-li (KOR)	2:23.375	QA
3	Shim Suk-hee (KOR)	2:23.492	QA
4	Alina Azhgaliyeva (KAZ)	2:25.091	QB
5	Punpreeda Prempreecha (THA)	2:34.879	QB
6	Battulgyn Gereltuyaa (MGL)	2:58.964	

==== Heat 3 ====
Rank	Athlete	Time	Notes
1	Yang Jingru (CHN)	2:32.710	QA
2	Zang Yize (CHN)	2:32.881	QA
3	Thanutchaya Chatthaisong (THA)	2:33.243	QB
4	Miyu Miyashita (JPN)	2:34.405	QB
5	Alyssa Pok (SGP)	2:36.748	
6	Olga Tikhonova (KAZ)	No time	

=== Finals ===
==== Final B ====
Rank	Athlete	Time
1	Alina Azhgaliyeva (KAZ)	2:39.740
2	Thanutchaya Chatthaisong (THA)	2:39.944
3	Madina Zhanbussinova (KAZ)	2:40.318
4	Miyu Miyashita (JPN)	2:40.708
5	Lam Ching Yan (HKG)	2:41.886
6	Punpreeda Prempreecha (THA)	2:46.781
7	Chang Wan-ting (TPE)	2:46.908

==== Final A ====
Rank	Athlete	Time
1	Kim Gil-li (KOR)	2:23.781
2	Gong Li (CHN)	2:23.884
3	Zang Yize (CHN)	2:23.965
4	Choi Min-jeong (KOR)	2:24.133
5	Shim Suk-hee (KOR)	2:24.201
6	Haruna Nagamori (JPN)	2:25.772
7	Yang Jingru (CHN)	3:18.179
