= Andrei Shutov =

Andrei Shutov may refer to:

- Andrei Shutov (academician) (born 1963), Russian political figure and historian
- Andrei Shutov (ice hockey) (born 1998), Kazakhstani ice hockey player
