= Biathlon at the 2025 Asian Winter Games – Men's relay =

Men's 4 × 7.5 kilometre relay at the 2025 Asian Winter Games
- Venue: Yabuli Ski Resort
- Dates: 13 February 2025
- Competitors: 28 from 7 nations

Medalists
gold medal	Japan; Kiyomasa Ojima, Mikito Tachizaki, Masaharu Yamamoto, Tsukasa Kobonoki
silver medal	Kazakhstan; Alexandr Mukhin, Asset Dyussenov, Kirill Bauer, Vladislav Kireyev
bronze medal	China; Hu Weiyao, Wu Hantu, Yan Xingyuan, Gu Cang

The men's 4×7.5 kilometre relay at the 2025 Asian Winter Games was held on 13 February 2025 at Yabuli Ski Resort in Harbin, China.

== Schedule ==
All times are China Standard Time (UTC+08:00)

Date	Time	Event
Thursday, 13 February 2025	13:00	Final

== Results ==
Rank	Team	Penalties			Time
Rank	Team	P	S	Total	Time
1st place, gold medalist(s)	Japan (JPN)	1+4	2+10	3+14	1:24:20.3
	Kiyomasa Ojima	0+0	1+3	1+3	20:56.1
	Mikito Tachizaki	1+3	0+3	1+6	21:38.9
	Masaharu Yamamoto	0+0	1+3	1+3	20:40.4
	Tsukasa Kobonoki	0+1	0+1	0+2	21:04.9
2nd place, silver medalist(s)	Kazakhstan (KAZ)	3+10	2+5	5+15	1:25:18.7
	Alexandr Mukhin	1+3	0+0	1+3	21:21.6
	Asset Dyussenov	2+3	0+1	2+4	21:05.0
	Kirill Bauer	0+1	2+3	2+4	21:48.5
	Vladislav Kireyev	0+3	0+1	0+4	21:03.6
3rd place, bronze medalist(s)	China (CHN)	2+8	2+4	4+12	1:25:32.7
	Hu Weiyao	0+1	0+0	0+1	20:37.9
	Wu Hantu	2+3	0+0	2+3	22:16.7
	Yan Xingyuan	0+2	0+1	0+3	20:20.3
	Gu Cang	0+2	2+3	2+5	22:17.8
4	South Korea (KOR)	0+6	4+10	4+16	1:28:22.5
	Choi Du-jin	0+2	0+1	0+3	20:32.1
	Kang Yoon-jae	0+2	2+3	2+5	23:28.3
	Kim Seong-yun	0+0	1+3	1+3	21:48.8
	Jung Min-seong	0+2	1+3	1+5	22:33.3
5	Mongolia (MGL)	0+10	2+6	2+16	1:33:09.9
	Enkhbatyn Enkhsaikhan	0+3	0+2	0+5	21:54.1
	Boldbaataryn Ankhbold	0+1	0+1	0+2	22:41.4
	Jargalyn Gantulga	0+3	0+0	0+3	22:20.3
	Otgondavaagiin Gantulga	0+3	2+3	2+6	26:14.1
6	Kyrgyzstan (KGZ)	4+9	8+12	12+21	1:47:29.2
	Artur Saparbekov	0+3	2+3	2+6	25:43.7
	Eldar Kadyrov	0+0	2+3	2+3	24:31.2
	Musa Rakhmanberdi Uulu	3+3	3+3	6+6	29:25.4
	Nurislam Zhumaliev	1+3	1+3	2+6	27:48.9
7	Thailand (THA)	12+12	10+12	22+24	2:00:32.1
	Thanakorn Ngoeichai	3+3	1+3	4+6	27:58.1
	Mark Chanloung	2+3	3+3	5+6	25:34.8
	Kitsakorn Kingsakul	4+3	2+3	6+6	33:48.1
	Naravich Saisuk	3+3	4+3	7+6	33:11.1
