= Ice Hockey Association of Thailand =

Governing body of ice hockey in Thailand

Thailand
- Association name: Ice Hockey Association of Thailand
- IIHF Code: THA
- IIHF membership: April 27, 1989
- President: M.L. Krisada Kasemsunt

The Ice Hockey Association of Thailand (IHAT) (Thai: สมาคมกีฬาฮอกกี้น้ำแข็งแห่งประเทศไทย) is the governing body and member of the International Ice Hockey Federation (IIHF) that oversees ice hockey in Thailand.
