= Tsukasa Kobonoki =

Japanese biathlete (born 1991)

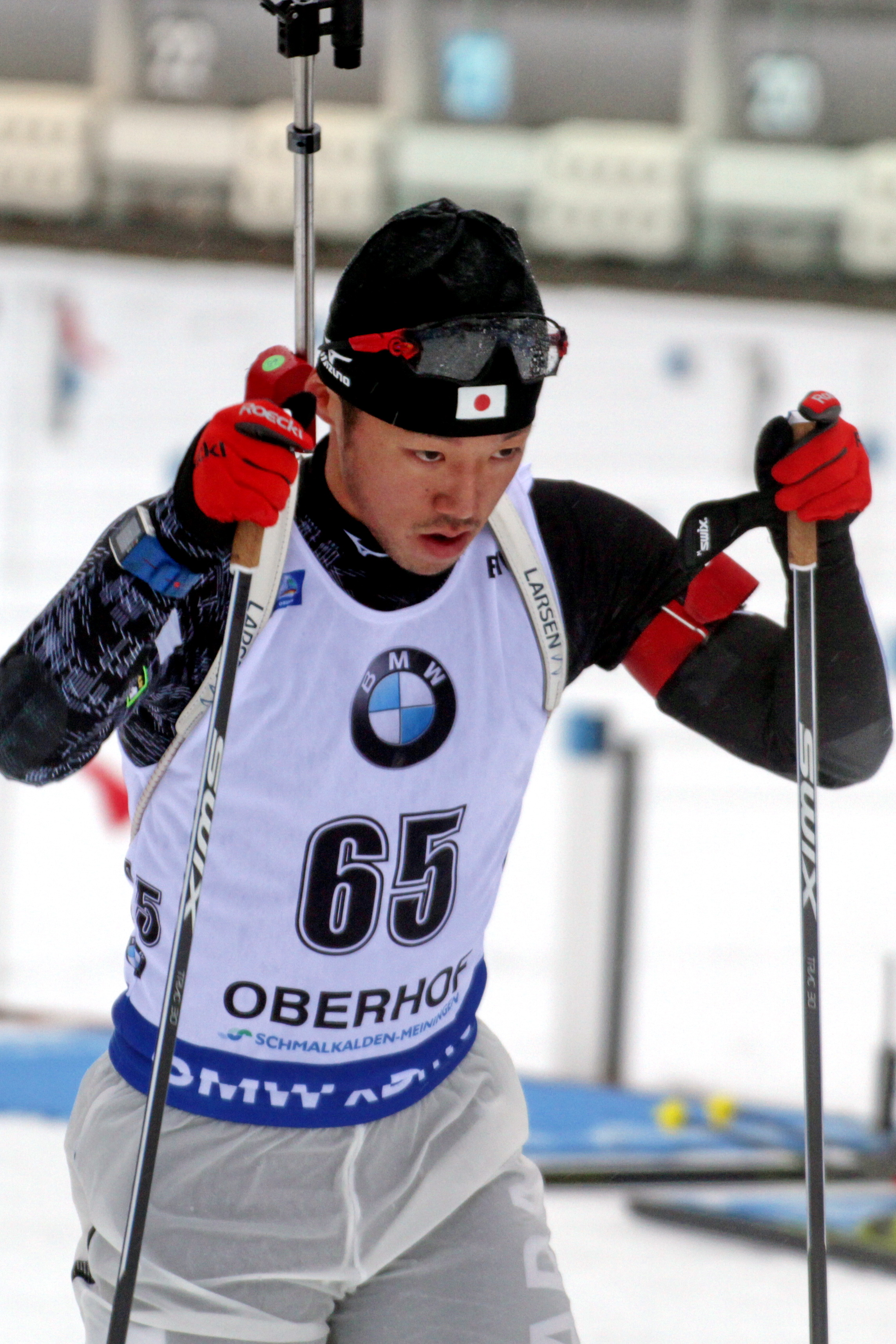
- Kobonoki in 2018

Personal information
- Born: 4 December 1991 (age 34) Tōhoku, Japan
- Height: 173 cm (5 ft 8 in)
- Weight: 71 kg (157 lb)

Sport
- Country: Japan
- Sport: Biathlon
Medal record
Men's biathlon
Representing Japan
Asian Winter Games
Bronze medal – third place	2017 Sapporo	Mixed relay
Gold medal – first place	2025 Harbin	Relay

Tsukasa Kobonoki (born 4 December 1991) is a Japanese biathlete.

== Career results ==
=== Olympic Games ===
0 medals

Event	Individual	Sprint	Pursuit	Mass start	Relay	Mixed relay
(China) 2022 Beijing	44th	41st	46th	—	—	18th

=== World Championships ===
0 medals

Event	Individual	Sprint	Pursuit	Mass start	Relay	Mixed relay	Single mixed relay
(Finland) 2015 Kontiolahti	69th	67th	—	—	21st	—	—N/a
(Norway) 2016 Oslo	75th	67th	—	—	22nd	—	—N/a
(Sweden) 2017 Östersund	68th	75th	—	—	15th	15th	—
(Italy) 2019 Antholz	52nd	48th	54th	—	20th	15th	—
(Slovenia) 2021 Pokljuka	56th	57th	41st	—	18th	20th	—

==== Rankings ====
Season	Individual	Sprint	Pursuit	Mass start	Overall Position
2014–15	25	—	—	—	86
2018–19	—	80	—	—	95
2020–21	—	68	—	—	82
