= Kathleen Dubberstein =

Filipino-American curler (born 1994)

- Curler
- Other names: Katie Dubberstein
- Born: Kathleen Sumbillo Dubberstein; May 8, 1994 (age 32); British Hong Kong

Team
- Skip: Kathleen Dubberstein
- Third: Leilani Dubberstein
- Second: Jessica Byers
- Lead: Lindsey Schmalz
- Mixed doubles partner: Marc Pfister

Curling career
- Member Association: United States (2013–2024); Philippines (2024–present)
- Other appearances: Asian Winter Games: 1 (2025)

Kathleen Sumbillo Dubberstein (born May 8, 1994) is a Filipino-American curler from Wisconsin. A 2014 United States Junior silver medalist, Dubberstein represents the Philippines internationally since 2024.

== Curling career ==
=== Women's ===
==== United States ====
Dubberstein competed at the United States Women's Curling Championship from 2013 to 2019. She also competed at the United States Junior Curling Championships with her team winning a silver in 2014.

==== Philippines ====
Dubberstein competed for the Philippines at the 2024 Pan Continental Curling Championships Division B tournament. Her team finished fourth losing to Kazakhstan in the Division B bronze medal game. Dubberstein would also skip the Philippines in the women's tournament at the 2025 Asian Winter Games, where the team would finish the round robin with a 4–4 record, just finishing outside the playoffs in 5th place.

Her team would return to represent the Philippines the following year at the 2025 Pan Continental Curling Championships Division B tournament, where they would win the event, this time beating Kazakhstan's Angelina Ebauyer 11–2 in the gold medal game.

=== Mixed doubles ===
Dubberstein partnered with Marc Pfister for the 2025 Asian Winter Games curling mixed doubles event. They opened their campaign with an upset against the South Korean team, and finished in fourth place with a 5–3 record, losing to China 6–5 in the bronze medal game.

== Personal life ==
Kathleen is the daughter of Eva and Steve Dubberstein. She has two sisters, Lani and Annmarie, who are also curlers. She was born in British Hong Kong but considers Portage, Wisconsin as her hometown. She is an alumna of Madison College.

== Teams ==
=== Women's ===
Season	Skip	Third	Second	Lead	Alternate	Coach	Events
2012–13	Sarah Anderson	Kathleen Dubberstein	Taylor Anderson	Leilani Dubberstein	Abigail Suslavich	Tyler George	2013 USJCC (4th)
2012–13	Sarah Anderson	Courtney Slata	Kathleen Dubberstein	Taylor Anderson			2013 USWCC (9th)
2013–14	Sarah Anderson	Kathleen Dubberstein	Taylor Anderson	Leilani Dubberstein		Wayne Anderson	2014 USJCC (silver)
2024–25	Kathleen Dubberstein	Leilani Dubberstein	Jennifer de la Fuente	Sheila Mariano	Anne Marie Bonache		2024 PCCC B-Division (4th); 2025 AWG (5th)
2025–26	Kathleen Dubberstein	Leilani Dubberstein	Jessica Byers	Lindsey Schmalz			2025 PCCC B-Division (gold)
2026–27	Kathleen Dubberstein	Leilani Dubberstein	Jessica Byers	Lindsey Schmalz	Anne Marie Bonache	Russ Duhaime	2026 World Qualifier

=== Mixed doubles ===
Season	Female	Male	Events
2024–25	Kathleen Dubberstein	Marc Pfister	2025 AWG (4th)
2025–26	Kathleen Dubberstein	Pedro Malvar	2026 World Mixed Doubles QE (TBD)
