= Nadezhda Stepashkina =

Kazakh cross-country skier (born 1998)

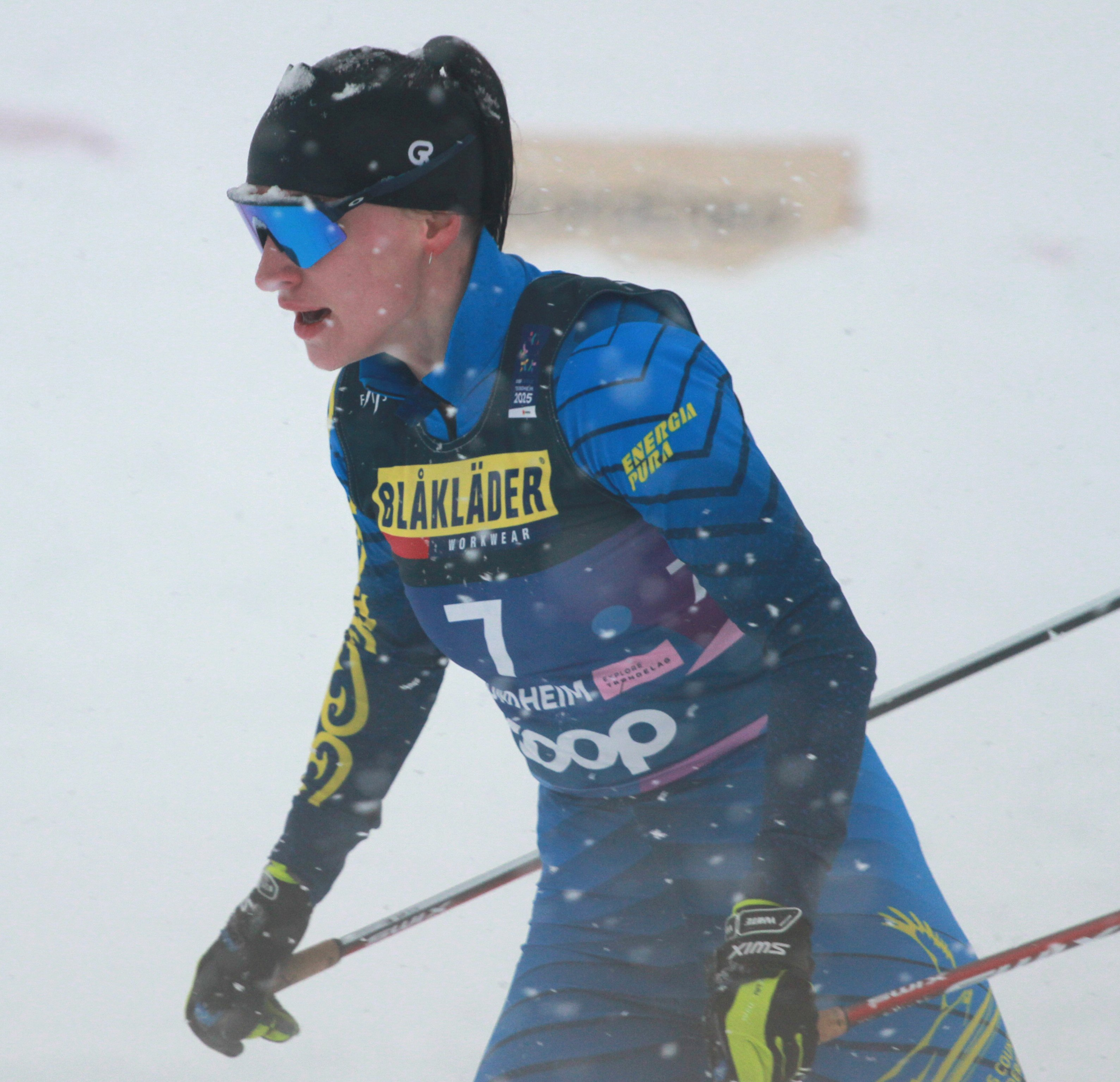
- Stepashkina in 2025

Personal information
- Native name: Надежда Александровна Степашкина
- Nationality: Kazakhstan
- Born: 4 September 1998 (age 27) Shchuchinsk, Akmola Region, Kazakhstan

Sport
- Sport: Skiing

Nadezhda Alexandrovna Stepashkina (Russian: Надежда Александровна Степашкина; born 4 September 1998) is a Kazakh cross-country skier who competes internationally.

She participated at the 2022 and 2026 Winter Olympics. She is the bronze medal winner of the 2023 Winter World University Games.

She placed 31st in the 50 km classical race at the 2026 Winter Olympics.

== Cross-country skiing results ==
All results are sourced from the International Ski Federation (FIS).

=== Olympic Games ===
Year	Age	10 km individual	Skiathlon	Sprint	Mass start	4 × 5 km relay	Team sprint
2022	23	57	49	51	58	15	19
2026	27	63	60	63	31	15	17
