= Alexandr Mukhin =

Kazakhstani biathlete (born 1998)

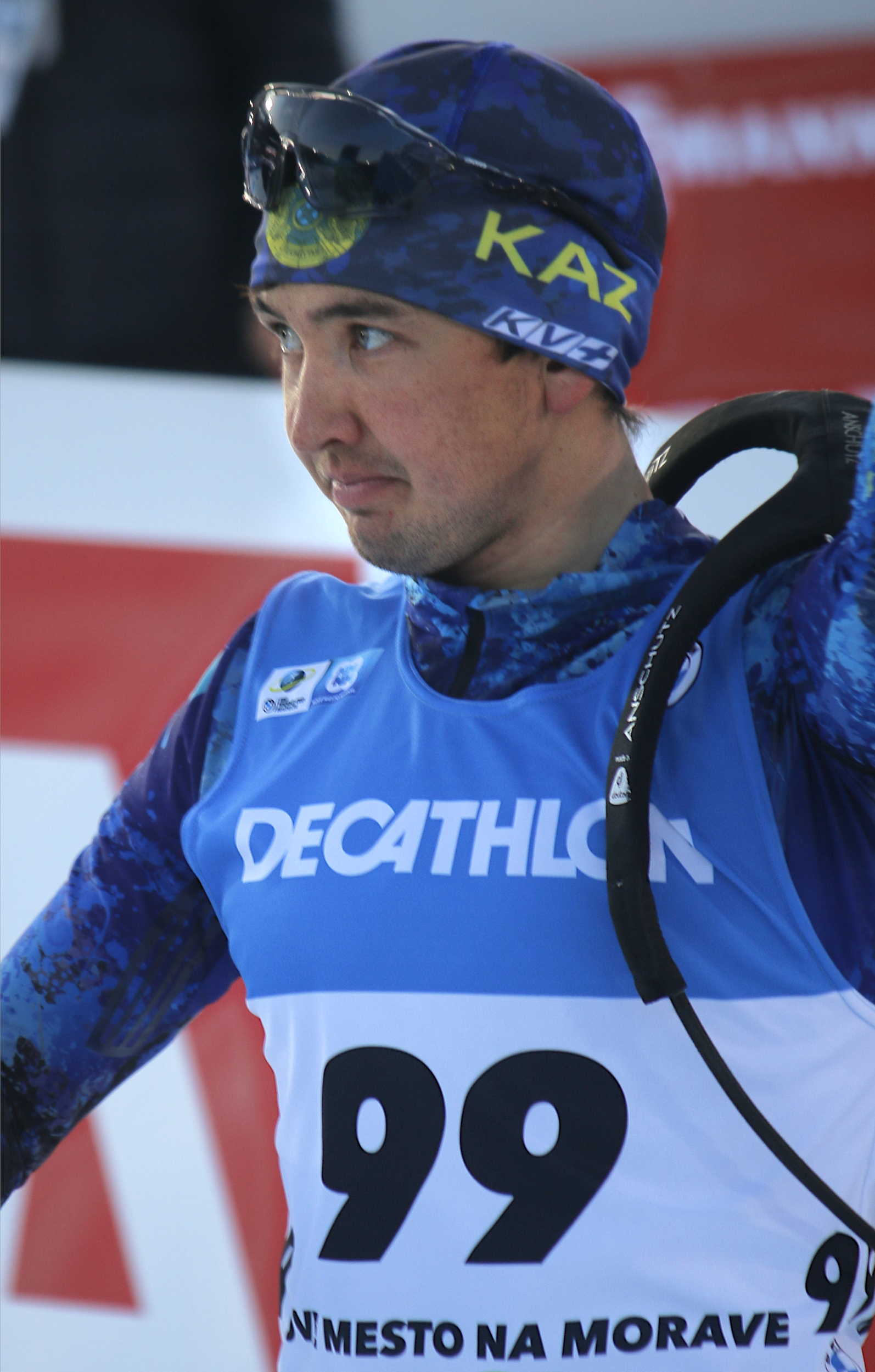
- Alexandr Mukhin in 2023

Personal information
- Nationality: Kazakh
- Born: 28 July 1998 (age 27) Balkashino, Kazakhstan
- Died: /

Sport
- Country: Kazakhstan
- Sport: Biathlon
Medal record
Men's biathlon
Representing Kazakhstan
Winter Universiade
Silver medal – second place	2023 Lake Placid	15 km mass start
Bronze medal – third place	2023 Lake Placid	10 km sprint
Asian Winter Games
Silver medal – second place	2025 Harbin	Relay

Alexandr Alexandrovich Mukhin (Russian: Александр Александрович Мухин, born 28 July 1998) is a Kazakhstani biathlete. He has competed in the Biathlon World Cup since 2020.

== Career results ==
=== Olympic Games ===
0 medals

Event	Individual	Sprint	Pursuit	Mass start	Relay	Mixed relay
(China) 2022 Beijing	52nd	49th	57th	—	—	—

=== World Championships ===
0 medals

Event	Individual	Sprint	Pursuit	Mass start	Relay	Mixed relay	Single mixed relay
(Italy) 2020 Antholz-Anterselva	83rd	91st	—	—	25th	22nd	—
(Slovenia) 2021 Pokljuka	68th	80th	—	—	23rd	27th	—
(Germany) 2023 Oberhof	61st	41st	36th	—	20th	26th	18th
(Czech Republic) 2024 Nové Město na Moravě	81st	35th	28th	—	10th	21st	23rd
(Switzerland) 2025 Lenzerheide	86th	—	—	—	23rd	—	—

*During Olympic seasons competitions are only held for those events not included in the Olympic program.
