= Jin Jin =

Jin Jin may refer to:

- Jin Jin (musician), British musician
- Jinjin (born 1996), South Korean musician

== See also ==
- Jin Jin and the Panda Patrol, 1994 TV series
- Jin Jing (born 1981), Chinese fencer
