= 2008 Summer Olympics summit of Mount Everest =

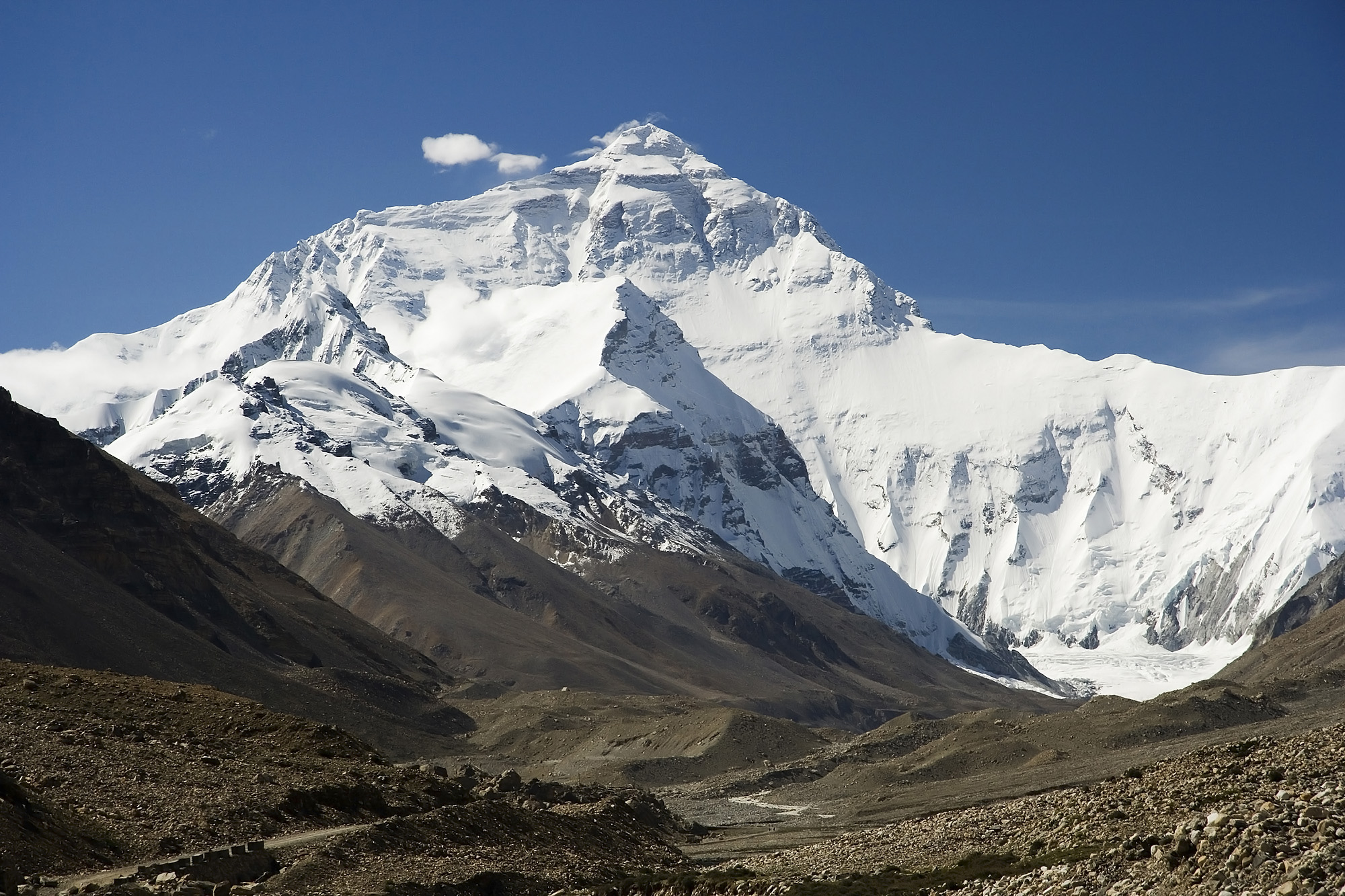
Mount Everest North Face, Tibet

The 2008 Summer Olympics summit of Mount Everest was the special route of the torch relay as part of the 2008 Summer Olympics taking place in China. Torchbearers reached Mount Everest at 9.20 in the morning (local time) on May 8, in parallel with the Shenzhen route. Another name for the climb is the Beijing Olympics Torch Relay Qomolangma Leg.

== Planning ==
The route taking the Olympic torch to the summit of the world's tallest peak was a side spur of the main relay, whilst the main relay continued elsewhere in China. It was the most technically challenging leg of the entire torch relay. Aside from the physical difficulty of scaling the mountain, the torch that was used for the climb had to be specially designed to burn in a frigid, windy, oxygen-thin environment.

== Preparation ==
In April the Chinese government completed a blacktop highway to the Mount Everest base camp to be used when the Olympic torch was taken to the peak. Workers spent 10 months widening, evening the surface of, and installing guardrails on the 67-mile road, the Xinhua News Agency said. "The upgraded highway ... will provide a safe path for drivers, tourists and mountaineers, and facilitate torchbearers (taking) the Olympic flame to the top of the world," the report said. Critics claim the highway, which begins in Tibet's Xigaze prefecture, will damage the permafrost in the ecologically fragile area. But officials said they had conducted a thorough study of the effects on the permafrost, and that the 150 million yuan (US$21.5 million, €13.5 million) project did not damage the environment.

The Chinese government said that the Everest event will be a show of international sportsmanship and national pride. "The torch relay to Mount Everest is a highlight of the whole relay, and it also represents the idea of green Olympics, high-tech Olympics and people's Olympics," Beijing Vice Mayor Liu Jingming said.

== Resistance ==
The government of Nepal imposed a complete communication ban on journalists and ordered soldiers and police to set up camps on Mount Everest with permission to use force against pro-Tibet demonstrators "to stop any anti-Chinese activities" during the torch's climb to the summit. "This could mean shooting if necessary," Home Ministry spokesman Mod Raj Dotel said.

== Climb ==
On May 8, the Chinese Mountaineering Team successfully scaled the world's highest peak. A total of 36 torchbearers participated in the torch relay, 12 of them reaching the summit from the 8,300-meter base camp. The relay was televised live on CCTV state television, and globally. On the summit, banners of the Olympic slogans were unfurled, and the first and last two torch-bearers were female Tibetan mountaineers.

== Criticism ==
On March 13, China announced it would restrict world mountaineers from climbing Everest and Cho Oyu over concerns that Tibet activists may try to disrupt plans for the climb. John Ackerly, president of the Washington-based International Campaign for Tibet, criticized the climb as an attempt by the PRC to legitimize Chinese rule: "Beijing is using the Olympics torch ceremony, which should stand for human freedoms and dignity, to bolster its territorial claim over Tibet."
