= Jin Jing =

Chinese fencer (born 1981)

Personal information
- Born: 1981 (age 44–45) Hefei, Anhui, China

Jin Jing
- Chinese: 金晶
Transcriptions
Standard Mandarin
- Hanyu Pinyin: Jīn Jīng
- Wade–Giles: Chin Ching
- IPA: [tɕín tɕíŋ]

Jin Jing (Chinese: 金晶; pinyin: Jīn Jīng; born 1981 in Hefei, Anhui, China) is a Chinese female Paralympic fencer. She was a torchbearer carrying the Olympic torch amid political protests during the 2008 Summer Olympics torch relay in Paris, France. According to ABC News, she fended off protestors who "threw themselves" at her; most were wrestled away by French police but at least one reached her wheelchair and tried to wrench the torch away. Jin has gained national fame in China because of the incident, but was attacked on Chinese internet bulletin boards for her stance in the following call to boycott French retailer Carrefour that resulted from public anger toward France. In contrast, Western media concentrated on how the incident involving Jin Jing ignited Chinese nationalism and claimed that the incident was exploited for propaganda purposes by the state media.

== Family and personal life ==
Jin Jing's parents are wage earners. Her father, Jin Jiansheng (金建生), is a sent-down youth who moved from Shanghai to Anhui during the Cultural Revolution, where he met and married Liu Huayao (刘华瑶). Jin was born in 1981, in Hefei, Anhui, She has a younger sister, Jin Renyu (金任钰).

Jin had part of her right leg amputated in 1989 when she was in elementary school after a malignant tumor was found on her ankle and later underwent a year of chemotherapy. She moved to Shanghai with her family in 1995 and studied information technology in a technical secondary school. After graduation, she worked as a telephone operator in a hotel in Shanghai. Jin got married in Shanghai in September 2013.

== Career ==
On July 13, 2001, the day when Beijing was elected the host city for 2008 Summer Olympics, Jin Jing became a member of the Shanghai Wheelchair Fencing Team. Later on she joined the Chinese National Wheelchair Fencing Team.

Her career as a fencer is summarized in the following table:

Year	Tournament	Venue	Event	Result	Source
2002	Wheelchair Fencing World Cup	Warsaw, Poland	Women's Wheelchair Fencing Épée	8 th	
2002	FESPIC Games	Busan, South Korea	Women's Wheelchair Fencing Épée	silver	
2002	FESPIC Games	Busan, South Korea	Women's Wheelchair Fencing Foil (Team)	bronze	
2003	6th National Paralympic Games of the P.R. China	Nanjing, China	Women's Wheelchair Fencing Épée	bronze	
2003	6th National Paralympic Games of the P.R. China	Nanjing, China	Women's Wheelchair Fencing Foil (Team)	silver	
2003	World Wheelchair Games	Christchurch, New Zealand	Women's Wheelchair Fencing Épée	bronze	
2005	National Table Tennis and Fencing Games	Nanjing, China	Women's Wheelchair Fencing Foil	bronze	
2005	Wheelchair Fencing World Cup	Hong Kong	Women's Wheelchair Fencing Épée	5 th	
2005	Wheelchair Fencing World Cup	Hong Kong	Women's Wheelchair Fencing Foil	5 th	

On May 6, 2008, Jin Jing was named as the ambassador of a Paralympic cheering group to help publicize Paralympic sports worldwide in the runup to the 2008 Summer Paralympics in Beijing.

On September 6, she brought the Paralympic torch into the Bird's Nest stadium during the Opening Ceremony of the Paralympic Games. On this occasion, she "made headlines in the Chinese media", according to the Agence France-Presse.

== 2008 Summer Olympics torch relay ==
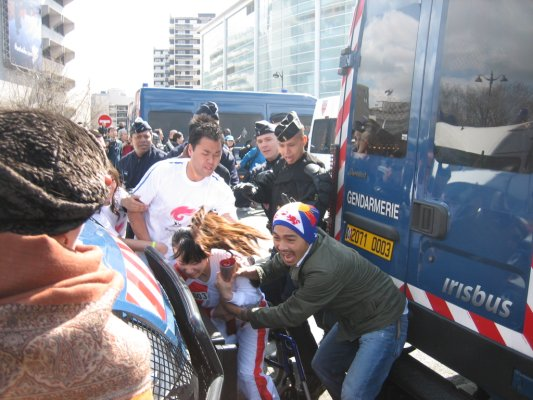
An attempt to wrestle the torch from Jin Jing in Paris

In 2007, Jin Jing turned up for a selective trial, titled You Are the Torchbearer, which was organized by China Central Television, and was chosen to be an Olympic torchbearer. On April 7, 2008, she was the third torchbearer carrying the Olympic Flame during the relay in Paris, amidst protests and physical attempts to snatch the torch by demonstrators. According to ABC News, "Protesters denouncing Chinese policy in Tibet threw themselves at Jin. Most were wrestled away by police but at least one reached her wheelchair and tried to wrench the torch away." Jin was quoted by the state-run newspaper China Daily as saying that she "would die to protect the torch." The International Olympic Committee president Jacques Rogge commented on the incident, saying, "What shocked me most is when someone tried to rob (sic?) the torch off a wheelchair athlete, a disabled athlete who was unable to defend the torch. This is unacceptable."

On her arrival back to Beijing, after the Paris relay, Jin was interviewed by Sohu. Of her experience of the relay, she said:

They began lunging towards me, trying to grab the torch from my hands. I tried to hide the torch with my body and managed to keep it from them. I was focused on the three or four separatists attacking me. I'm not sure how many were behind me. I felt people trying to take the torch from me. That's when some of the escort runners, as well as the tourist guide assigned to me in Paris, came over to help me, drawing the attackers away. People ask me how I dealt with the danger. I don't think I thought too much about it. I trusted the escorts around me. They were the ones, along with my guide, that faced the danger.

Commenting on Tibet itself in interviews, she said she knew little of politics before encountering the demonstrations in Paris, and had never heard of the pro-Tibet independence movement. When asked by the UK's The Daily Telegraph she also said, "My opinion before was that Tibet was an inseparable part of our country, now I hold this point more firmly than before."

Jin has been celebrated first on internet bulletin boards and soon in Chinese media. She was treated to a hero's welcome upon her return to Beijing and China's news reports described her as the "Smiling Angel in Wheelchair" and the "Most Beautiful Torchbearer". According to Canada's The Globe and Mail, initially the state media of China censored all reports on the torch protests and the incident involving Jin Jing, but it soon reported on the protest and portrayed China as the victim, thus appealing to patriotic sentiments. The UK's The Times wrote that Chinese media coverage of the Paris leg of the relay was "reminiscent of the Cultural Revolution when propaganda organs were able to whip up the public into a frenzy of rage over an issue of their choice." The Associated Press wrote that Jin is "now known as a defender of China's dignity" and joins "a list of heroes promoted by the communist government's propaganda authorities", while The Sydney Morning Herald called her a "new heroine in China" by whom Beijing "is trying to claw back one or two propaganda points from the torch's recent rocky progress." The French magazine Marianne devoted a full page to her in its 26 April edition, and commented that the Chinese flame attendants were "strangely" absent when Jin carried the torch, leaving it up to the French police alone to guard Jin and her companions. But according to the interview Jin gave to Sohu on April 9, she was waiting to accept the flame as the third torchbearer, and security was "relatively light" around her, when the protestors "began lunging" at her. Marianne wrote that Jin's story had become a "legend skillfully propagated" by the Chinese media: "Images of Jin Jing holding the torch against her heart, her eyes closed in her lovely face, are being shown over and over on CCTV and are inflaming the Chinese Internet," making Jin famous for "hundreds of millions of Chinese viewers and netizens." The French newspaper Le Figaro published an analysis of what it referred to as "the Jin Jing phenomenon": "The media have been drumming into people's heads the story of this young woman who became, in the space of an incident in Paris, the symbol of Chinese pride in the face of Western hostility. The actions of the media bore their fruit, and the 'angel in a wheelchair' has generated unprecedented enthusiasm in China and among Chinese communities all over the world."

The event involving Jin Jing in Paris sparked outrage around China, and Chinese citizens started to urge on the internet for a boycott of French goods and businesses, and touted to "hunt down" the protester who accosted Jin and "teach him a lesson." On April 21, two weeks after the incident, Jin received a personal letter from French president Nicolas Sarkozy, delivered by Senate President Christian Poncelet. In the letter Sarkozy referred to the attack as "intolerable", and said he "condemns it with the utmost force." Xinhua reported that Jin was "very glad to be invited by President Sarkozy to France" and that she "hope[d] to contribute her own efforts to cementing the Sino-France friendship". However, Jin also expressed her disappointment to the press later that Sarkozy "expressed regret, shock and condemnation but no apology."

On September 18, 2008, Jin was received by President Sarkozy at the Palais de l'Elysée. Sarkozy publicly stated that he was "very happy to greet [her]", and praised her "exemplary courage". Reuters, describing Jin as a "nationalist icon", reported that the incident in Paris had "caused a diplomatic rift between China and France that Sarkozy has been at pains to mend ever since", and that his hosting of Jin at the Elysée palace was a means of "heal[ing] [the] rift".

== Boycott of Carrefour ==
In April 2008, amidst calls in China to boycott French retailer Carrefour to show anger towards France and the experience Jin Jing had in Paris, Jin said she does not want people to boycott Carrefour since most of its employees are Chinese and they will be first affected. She also spoke in support of "Chinese people's friendship with the French", wished the best for French athletes at the Beijing Olympics, and added: "We Chinese people will certainly welcome French people and athletes to China with a tolerant, friendly and passionate attitude." She had received strong personal attacks on Chinese bulletin boards, though her popularity is still considered very high. So far, she is still called "The Angel in Wheelchair".

== See also ==
- Paralympic sports
- Sports in China
