= 2018 Winter Paralympics torch relay =

XI Paralympic Winter Games
- Host city: Pyeongchang, South Korea
- Countries visited: Great Britain, South Korea
- Start date: March 2, 2018
- End date: March 9, 2018

The 2018 Winter Paralympics Torch Relay was an 8-day event leading up to the 2018 Winter Paralympic Games in Pyeongchang. It began on March 2, 2018, in Seoul and concluded at the Games' opening ceremony on March 9. It is held entirely within South Korea, the host country

== Route ==

March 2
Jeju City
Anyang
Nonsan
Gochang
Cheongdo
March 3
Seoul
March 9
Pyeongchang

== See also ==
- 2012 Summer Paralympics torch relay
- 2014 Winter Paralympics torch relay
- 2016 Summer Paralympics torch relay
- 2022 Winter Paralympics torch relay
