= 2014 Winter Paralympics torch relay =

X Paralympic Winter Games
- Host city: Sochi, Russia
- Countries visited: Great Britain, Russia
- Start date: February 26, 2014
- End date: March 7, 2014

The 2014 Winter Paralympics Torch Relay was a 10-day event leading up to the 2014 Winter Paralympic Games in Sochi. It began on February 26, 2014, in Cape Dezhnyov and concluded at the Games' opening ceremony on March 7. It is held entirely within Russia, the host country

== Route ==
Route	Map
February 26 (day 1): Cape Dezhnev; February 26 (day 1): Vladivostok; February 26 (day 1): Khabarovsk; February 26 (day 1): Magadan; February 26 (day 1): Anadyr; February 26 (day 1): Yakutsk	2014 Winter Paralympics torch relay is located in Far Eastern Federal District
March 4 (day 8): Magas; March 4 (day 8): Nazran	2014 Winter Paralympics torch relay is located in North Caucasian Federal District
March 5 (day 8): Krasnodar; March 5 (day 8): Taganrog; March 5 (day 8): Volgograd; March 6 (day 9): Sochi	2014 Winter Paralympics torch relay is located in Southern Federal District

== See also ==
- 2008 Summer Paralympics torch relay
- 2010 Winter Paralympics torch relay
- 2012 Summer Paralympics torch relay
