= 2022 Winter Paralympics torch relay =

XII Paralympic Winter Games
- Host city: Beijing, China
- Torchbearers: 565
- Theme: Health, Joy and Energy
- Start date: 2 March 2022
- End date: 4 March 2022

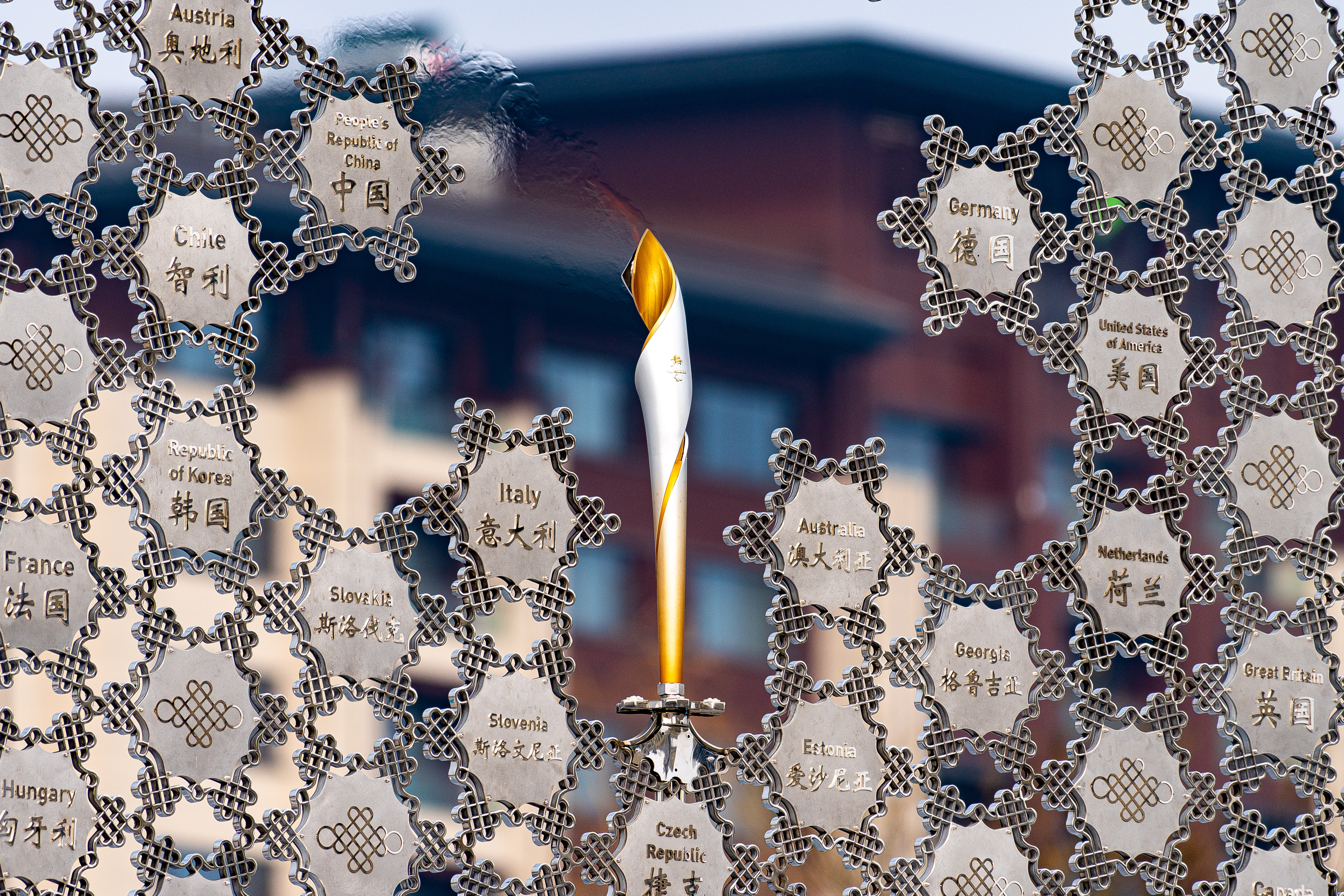
Like the 2022 Winter Olympics, the Paralympic torch also serves as the cauldron

The 2022 Winter Paralympics torch relay was a three-day event leading up to the 2022 Winter Paralympics held in Beijing, China. In total, 565 torchbearers carried the torch.

In Stoke Mandeville, United Kingdom, the Paralympic Heritage Flame was lit as part of the torch relay on 1 March. The torch relay began on 2 March and ended during the opening ceremony of the Games two days later on 4 March.

== Route ==
- 1 March: The flame was lit in Stoke Mandeville, United Kingdom and was sent virtually to Beijing
- 2 March: Local flame lighting celebrations in Beijing, Yanqing and Zhangjiakou.Unification of flames in front of the Temple of Heaven
- 3 March: 6 local legs of the relay were held
- 4 March: 3 final legs and the Beijing National Stadium (Part of opening ceremony).

== See also ==
- 2008 Summer Paralympics torch relay
- 2008 Summer Olympics torch relay
- 2018 Winter Paralympics torch relay
- 2022 Winter Olympics torch relay
- 2022 Asian Games torch relay
- 2022 Asian Para Games torch relay
- 2021 Summer University World Games torch relay
