= 2022 Asian Games torch relay =

- Host city: Hangzhou, China
- Countries visited: 1
- Distance: 1.507.10km
- Torch bearers: 2,022
- Start date: 8 September 2023
- End date: 23 September 2023

The 2022 Asian Games torch relay was held from 8 September 2023, through 11 prefectures across Zhejiang, before the opening ceremony on 23 September 2023. Prior to the relay, a lighting ceremony was held back on 15 June 2023 in Hangzhou. Due the fact that India and China were in political tensions, the New Delhi fire ceremony was cancelled and a full domestic relay was held.

== Detail ==
The flame was lit in the Archaeological Site of Liangzhu on 15 June 2023. The physical torch relay started on 8 September 2023 and was travel across the 11 biggest cities of Zhejiang. Like the 2010 Asian Games, a virtual torch relay was held. The virtual relay also started on 15 June 2023 and finished on the night of 5 September 2023.

== Route ==
Date	City	Length	Notable torchbearers	Number of torchbearers
8 September	West Lake, Hangzhou	5.2 km	Luo Xuejuan - Olympic gold medalist Swimmer; Daniel Zhang - Former CEO of Alibaba Group; Hui Ruoqi - Olympic gold medalist Volleyball; Zhang Yimou – film director Mai Jia - Novelist; Bai Yansong - Journalist and anchor of CCTV; Wang Shuang - Footballer from China's women national team Yang Qian - Olympic gold medalist Shooting sports	106
9 September	Huzhou	–	Zhou Suhong – Olympic gold medalist Volleyball; Wu Jingyu – Olympic gold medalist Taekwondo; Li Rongxiang – Asian Games gold medalist javelin throw	170
10 September	Jiaxing	8.8 km	Wang Yilyu – Olympic gold medalist Badminton	170
11 September	Shaoxing	–	Jiang Yuyan – Paralympic gold medalist swimmer	170
12 September	Ningbo	–	Yuan Xinyue – Olympic gold medalist Volleyball; Wang Chang; Adiljan Suleyman – Asian Games gold medalist Basketball	170
13 September	Zhoushan	10.9 km	–	170
14 September	Taizhou	8 km	–	170
15 September	Wenzhou	–	Zhu Qinan; Li Hong – Asian Games gold medalist karate Pan Feihong; Ye Xiaopeng; Chen Huijia; Zheng Siwei	170
16 September	Lishui	–	–	170
17 September	Jinhua	–	Meng Guanliang – Olympic gold medalist canoeing	170
18 September	Rest day			
19 September	Quzhou	–	–	170
20 September	Hangzhou	–	Chen Yufei – Olympic gold medalist Badminton; Sha Xiaolan - Film director Shi Yigong - Biophysicist, President of Westlake University; Guo Jingjing - Olympic gold medalist Diver; Dinigeer Yilamujiang - A cross-country skier Lou Yun - Olympic gold medalist Gymnastic; Zhao Jiawen - Nordic skier Wong Kam-po - Racing cyclist, Coach of Team Hong Kong; Wang Zhouyu - Olympic gold medalist Weightlifter; Wu Yibing - Tennis Player	210
21–22 September	Rest day			
23 September	Hangzhou Sports Park Stadium (Part of opening ceremony)	–	Ye Shiwen - Olympic gold medalist Swimmer; Fan Zhendong - Olympic gold medalist Table tennis Xu Mengtao - Olympic gold medalist Freestyle skiing Shi Zhiyong - Olympic gold medalist Weightlifter; Li Lingwei - Asian Games gold medalist Badminton; Wang Shun - Olympic gold medalist Swimmer	6
