= 2010 Winter Olympics torch relay =

- Host city: Vancouver, Canada
- Countries visited: Greece, Canada, United States; See full route
- Torchbearers: 12,000 approx.
- Start date: October 30, 2009
- End date: February 12, 2010
- Torch designer: Leo Obstbaum

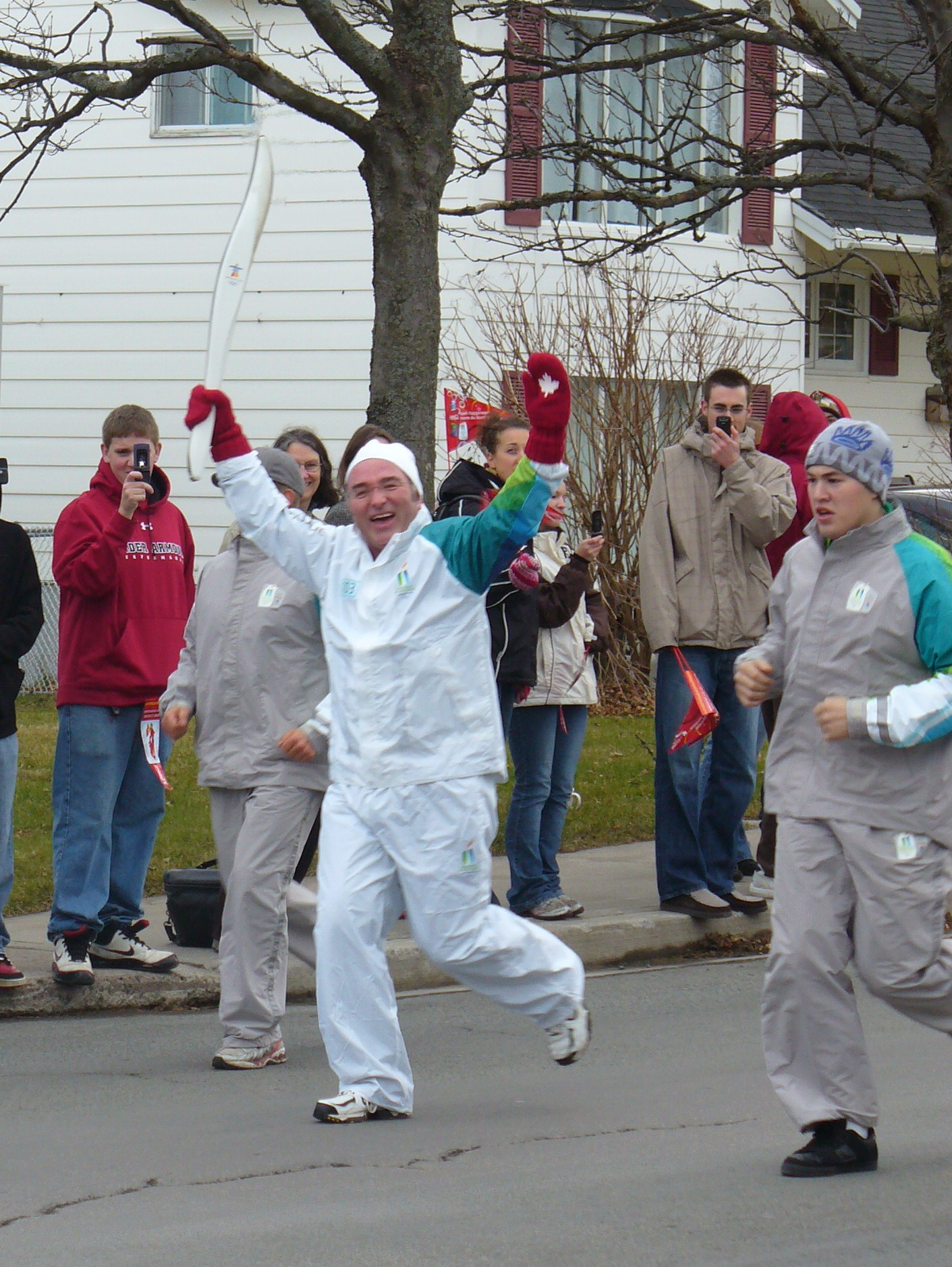
The torch passing by Memorial University of Newfoundland in St. John's, Newfoundland and Labrador on November 13, 2009.

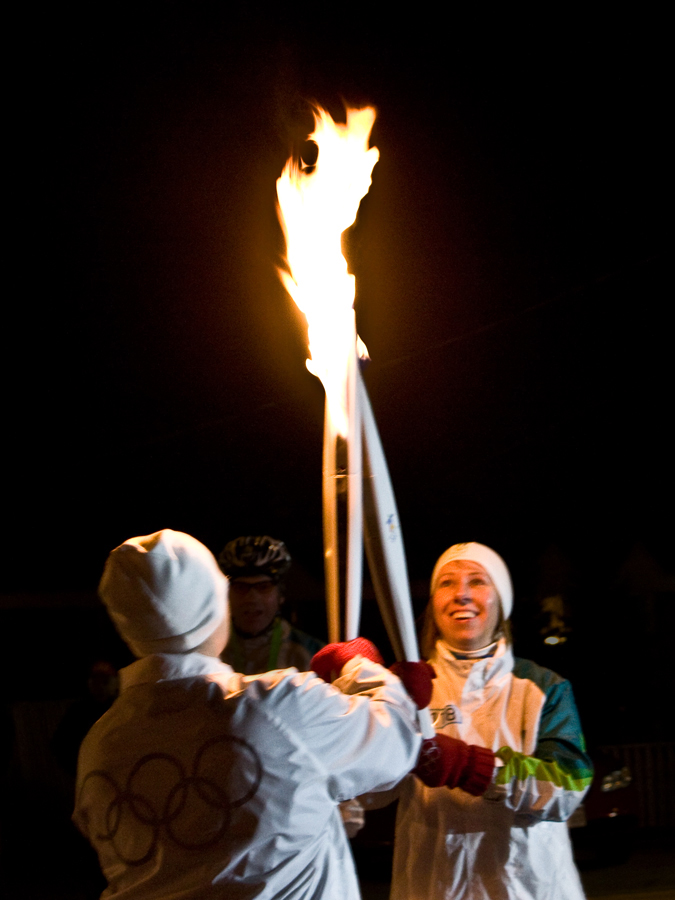
The flame is passed in Moncton, New Brunswick, on November 23, 2009.

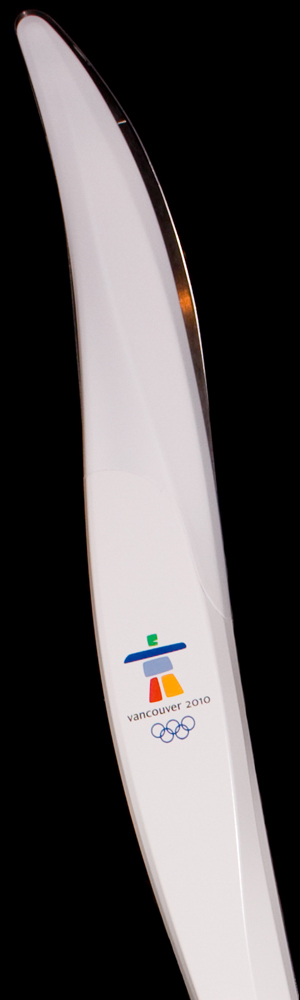
A closeup of the 2010 Olympic Torch.

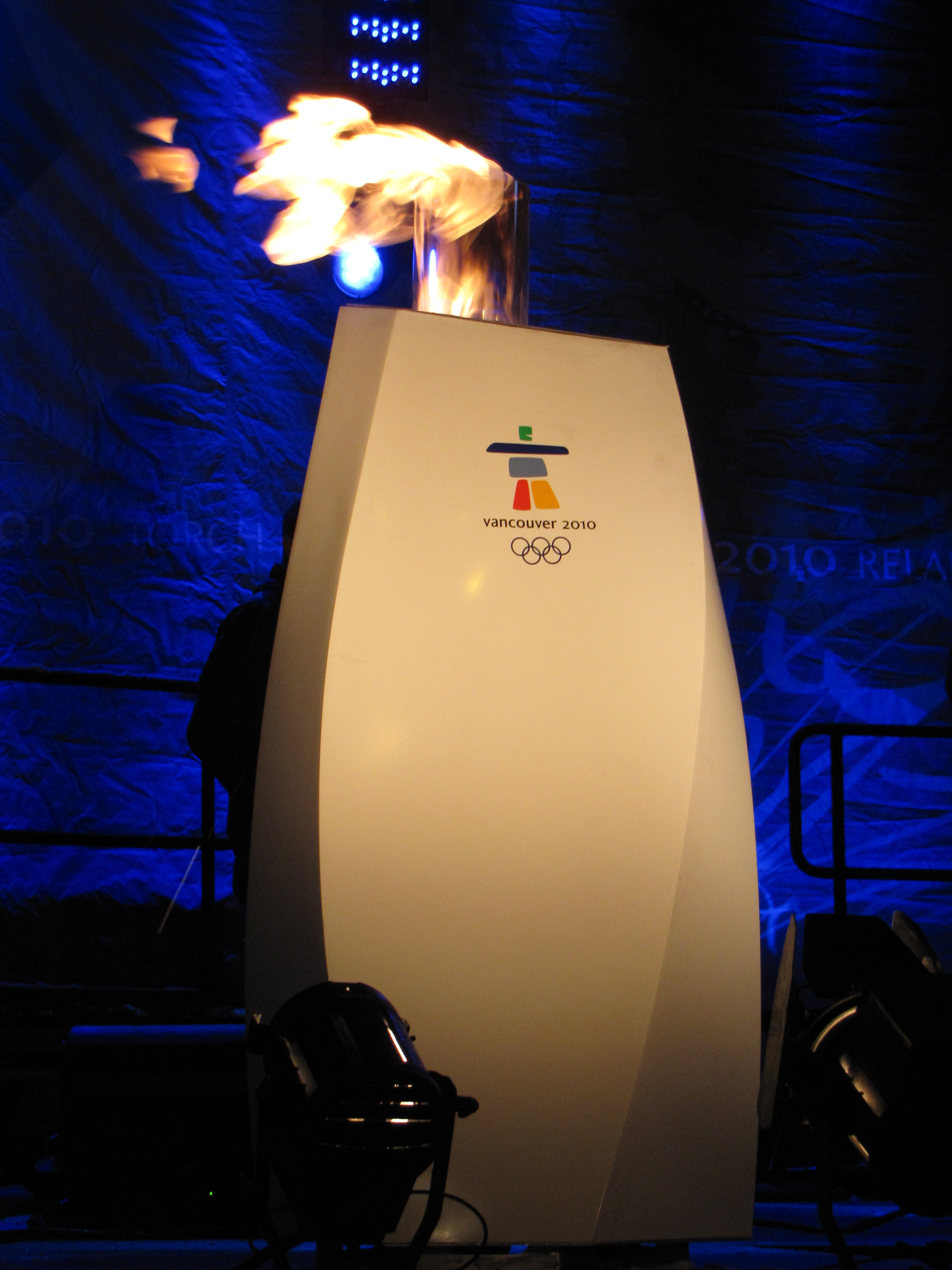
Photo of one of the miniature displays used to show the flame during the community celebrations.

The 2010 Winter Olympics Torch Relay was a 106-day run, from October 30, 2009, until February 12, 2010, prior to the 2010 Winter Olympics. Plans for the relay were originally announced November 21, 2008, by the Vancouver Organizing Committee for the 2010 Olympic and Paralympic Winter Games (VANOC). Communities were initially informed in June 2008, but the locations were not announced for "security reasons". Exact routes were later announced several weeks before the start of the torch relay.

The torches used in the Olympic relay were designed by Leo Obstbaum (1969–2009), the late director of design for the 2010 Winter Games.

There were an estimated 12,000 torchbearers, including notable Canadian celebrities such as Shania Twain, Simon Whitfield, Silken Lauman, Alexandre Despatie, Catriona Le May Doan and John Hayman and past and present NHL hockey stars including Sidney Crosby, Wayne Gretzky, and the captains of the Vancouver Canucks teams that went to the Stanley Cup Final, Trevor Linden (1994) and Stan Smyl (1982). In fact, many television personalities were selected as torchbearers for the relay, mainly from CTV's parent company, CTVglobemedia. Matt Lauer and American actor, bodybuilder, and former California Governor Arnold Schwarzenegger were also torch bearers.

On October 22, 2009, the Olympic Torch was lit during a ceremony held at the Ancient Olympia in Greece. Actress Maria Nafpliotou played the role of the High Priestess and ignited the flame using a parabolic mirror and the sun's ray. The first torch was carried by Olympic skier Vassilis Dimitriadis.

Kept under close secrecy, the final Olympic Torchbearer turned out to be not one, but five final torchbearers. Rick Hansen brought it into BC Place Stadium, in turn lighting Catriona Le May Doan's torch, who lit Steve Nash's torch, and the flame continued to Nancy Greene and Wayne Gretzky. Three of the four torchbearers lit the indoor Olympic Cauldron; Le May Doan remained with her torch due to a malfunction causing only three of the four arms to be raised. Gretzky exited BC Place, with his torch still lit, and caught a ride on the back of a VANOC vehicle, to Coal Harbour, where he lit the outdoor Cauldron. This makes Gretzky the first person to light two official cauldrons in the same Olympics.

At the start of the closing ceremony, Le May Doan re-lit the indoor Cauldron after clown and mime Yves Dagenais "fixed" and "raised" the arm that malfunctioned in the opening ceremony.

== Relay elements ==
=== Torch ===
The torches used for 2010 relay and the lighting ceremonies were made by designers at Bombardier Inc.'s Aerospace division.

=== Route ===
1. Before October 30: Olympia, Greece
2. October 30: Victoria, British Columbia, loop
3. October 31: Victoria to Nanaimo
4. November 1: Nanaimo to Tofino
5. November 2: Tofino to Courtenay to Campbell River
6. November 3: Campbell River to Whitehorse, Yukon
7. November 4: Whitehorse to Inuvik, Northwest Territories
8. November 5: Inuvik to Yellowknife, briefly entering Nunavut
9. November 6: Yellowknife to Cold Lake, Alberta
10. November 7: Cold Lake to Churchill, Manitoba, going through Saskatchewan
11. November 8: Churchill to Alert, Nunavut
12. November 9: Alert to Iqaluit
13. November 10: Iqaluit to Gaspé, Quebec
14. November 11: Sept-Îles to Labrador City, Newfoundland and Labrador to Happy Valley-Goose Bay, Newfoundland and Labrador
15. November 12: Happy Valley-Goose Bay to St. John's
16. November 13: St. John's loop
17. November 14: St. John's to Grand Falls-Windsor
18. November 15: Grand Falls-Windsor to Channel-Port aux Basques
19. November 16: Channel-Port aux Basques to Port Hawkesbury, Nova Scotia
20. November 17: Port Hawkesbury to Truro
21. November 18: Truro to Halifax, Nova Scotia
22. November 19: Halifax loop
23. November 20: Halifax to Lunenburg
24. November 21: Lunenburg to Charlottetown, Prince Edward Island
25. November 22: Charlottetown to Summerside
26. November 23: Summerside to Moncton, New Brunswick
27. November 24: Moncton to Saint John
28. November 25: Saint John to Fredericton
29. November 26: Not travelling, staying in Fredericton.
30. November 27: Fredericton to Bathurst
31. November 28: Bathurst to Edmundston
32. November 29: Edmundston to Rimouski, Quebec
33. November 30: Rimouski to Baie-Comeau, Quebec
34. December 1: Baie-Comeau to Saguenay (Alma)
35. December 2: Saguenay to Quebec City
36. December 3: Quebec City to Lévis
37. December 4: Lévis to Saint-Georges
38. December 5: Saint-Georges to Sherbrooke
39. December 6: Sherbrooke to Trois-Rivières
40. December 7: Trois-Rivières to Longueuil
41. December 8: Longueuil to Beaconsfield
42. December 8: Beaconsfield to Kahnawake
43. December 9: Kahnawake to Mont-Tremblant
44. December 10: Mont-Tremblant to Montreal
45. December 11: Montreal to Gatineau
46. December 12: Gatineau to Ottawa, Ontario
47. December 13: Ottawa loop
48. December 14: Ottawa to Kingston
49. December 15: Kingston to Peterborough
50. December 16: Peterborough to Oshawa
51. December 17: Oshawa to Toronto
52. December 18: Toronto to Brampton
53. December 19: Brampton to Hamilton
54. December 20: Hamilton to Niagara Falls
55. December 21: Niagara Falls to Brantford
56. December 22: Brantford to Chatham
57. December 23: Chatham to Windsor
58. December 24: Windsor to London
59. December 25: Not travelling, staying in London.
60. December 26: Not travelling, staying in London.
61. December 27: London to Kitchener
62. December 28: Kitchener to Owen Sound
63. December 29: Owen Sound to Barrie
64. December 30: Barrie to North Bay
65. December 31: North Bay to Val-d'Or, Quebec
66. January 1, 2010: Val-d'Or to Timmins, Ontario
67. January 2: Timmins to Sault Ste. Marie
68. January 3: Sault Ste. Marie to Thunder Bay
69. January 4: Thunder Bay to Kenora
70. January 5: Kenora to Winnipeg, Manitoba
71. January 6: Winnipeg loop
72. January 7: Winnipeg to Portage la Prairie
73. January 8: Portage la Prairie to Brandon
74. January 9: Brandon to Regina
75. January 10: Regina to Swift Current
76. January 11: Swift Current to Saskatoon to Prince Albert
77. January 12: Prince Albert to Lloydminster
78. January 13: Lloydminster to Edmonton, Alberta
79. January 14: Not travelling, staying in Edmonton.
80. January 15: Edmonton to Red Deer
81. January 16: Red Deer to Medicine Hat
82. January 17: Medicine Hat to Lethbridge
83. January 18: Lethbridge to Crossfield
84. January 19: Calgary to Airdrie
85. January 20: Calgary to Banff
86. January 21: Banff to Golden, British Columbia
87. January 22: Golden to Cranbrook
88. January 23: Cranbrook to Nelson
89. January 24: Nelson to Osoyoos
90. January 25: Osoyoos to Kelowna
91. January 26: Kelowna to Revelstoke
92. January 27: Revelstoke to Kamloops
93. January 28: Kamloops to Williams Lake
94. January 29: Williams Lake to Prince George
95. January 30: Prince George to Smithers
96. January 31: Smithers to Fort St. John
97. February 1: Fort St. John to Prince Rupert
98. February 2: Prince Rupert to Port Hardy
99. February 3: Port Hardy to Powell River
100. February 4: Powell River to Squamish
101. February 5: Squamish to Whistler
102. February 6: Whistler to Merritt
103. February 7: Merritt to Abbotsford
104. February 8: Abbotsford to Surrey
105. February 9: Surrey to Richmond (The torch briefly went into the United States at the Peace Arch in Surrey, British Columbia, and Blaine, Washington)
106. February 10: Richmond to West Vancouver, British Columbia
107. February 11: West Vancouver to Vancouver
108. February 12: Within Vancouver to BC Place Stadium

== See also ==
- 2010 Winter Paralympics torch relay
