= 2012 Summer Paralympics torch relay =

XIV Paralympic Games
- Host city: London, United Kingdom
- Countries visited: United Kingdom
- Start date: 22 August 2012
- End date: 29 August 2012
- Torch designer: Edward Barber and Jay Osgerby

The 2012 Summer Paralympics torch relay ran from 22 to 29 August 2012, prior to the 2012 Summer Paralympics. The relay began with four flames kindled on the highest peaks of the four nations of the United Kingdom, which were then brought to their respective capital cities for special events honouring the upcoming Games. For the relay proper, the four national flames were united at a ceremony in Stoke Mandeville in preparation for a final 92-mile (148-kilometre) journey to London.

== Relay ==
=== Journey to Stoke Mandeville ===
Based on the concept used for the 2002 Winter Paralympics torch relay, the Paralympic torch relay began on 22 August 2012. In a ceremony representing human endeavour, groups of disabled and non-disabled scouts kindled the four Paralympic flames on the highest peaks of each nation of the United Kingdom; Scafell Pike in England, Ben Nevis in Scotland, Slieve Donard in Northern Ireland, and Snowdon in Wales. The four flames were then brought down from each peak in lanterns. On 24 August the flames were used to light ceremonial cauldrons in their respective capital cities (London, Edinburgh, Belfast and Cardiff) during the "Flame Festival" events. A total of 38 communities also hosted their "Flame Celebration" events over the August Bank Holiday weekend, where community representatives collected a part of their nation's flame to held for their respective events.

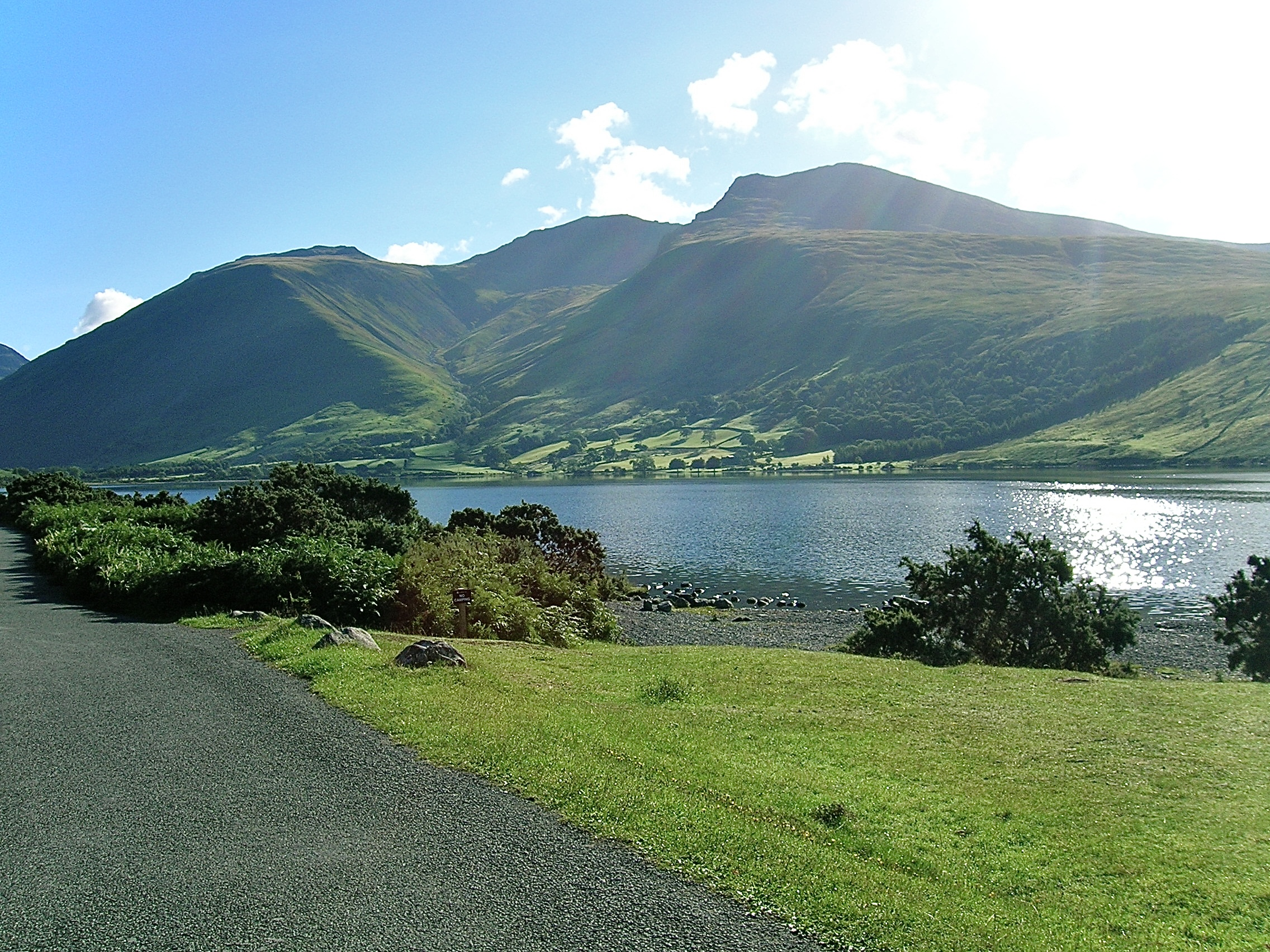
Scafell Pike

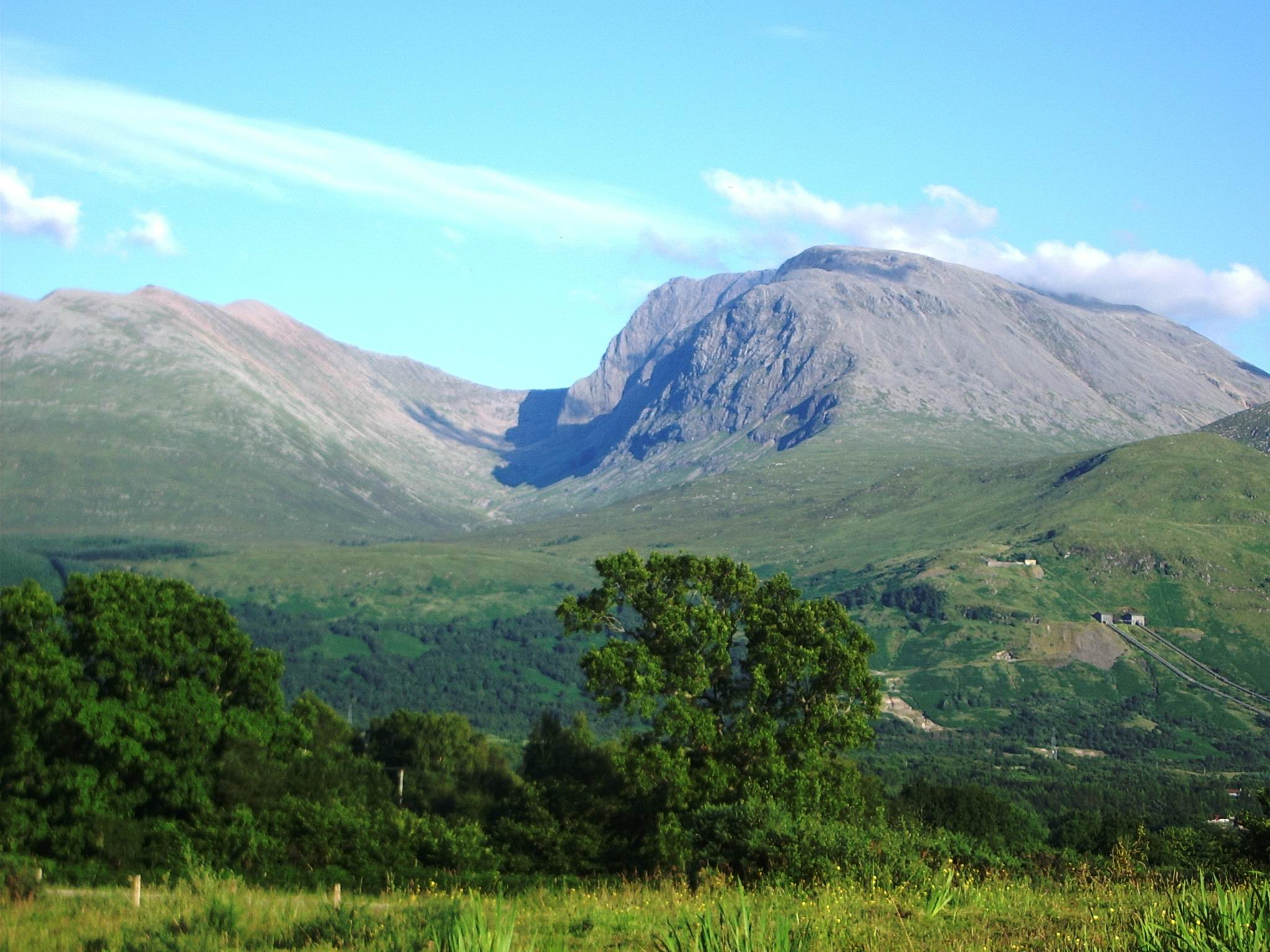
Ben Nevis

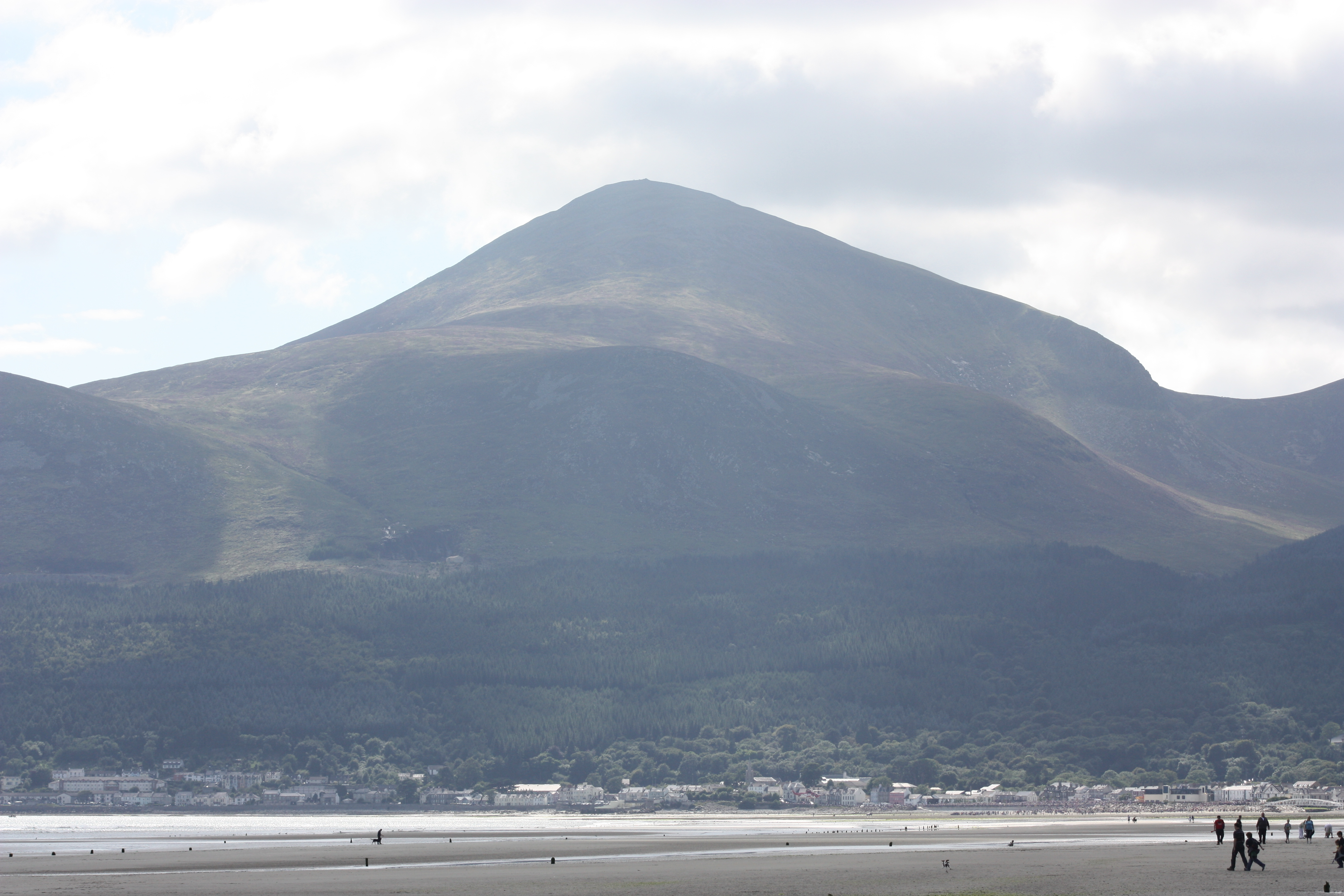
Slieve Donard

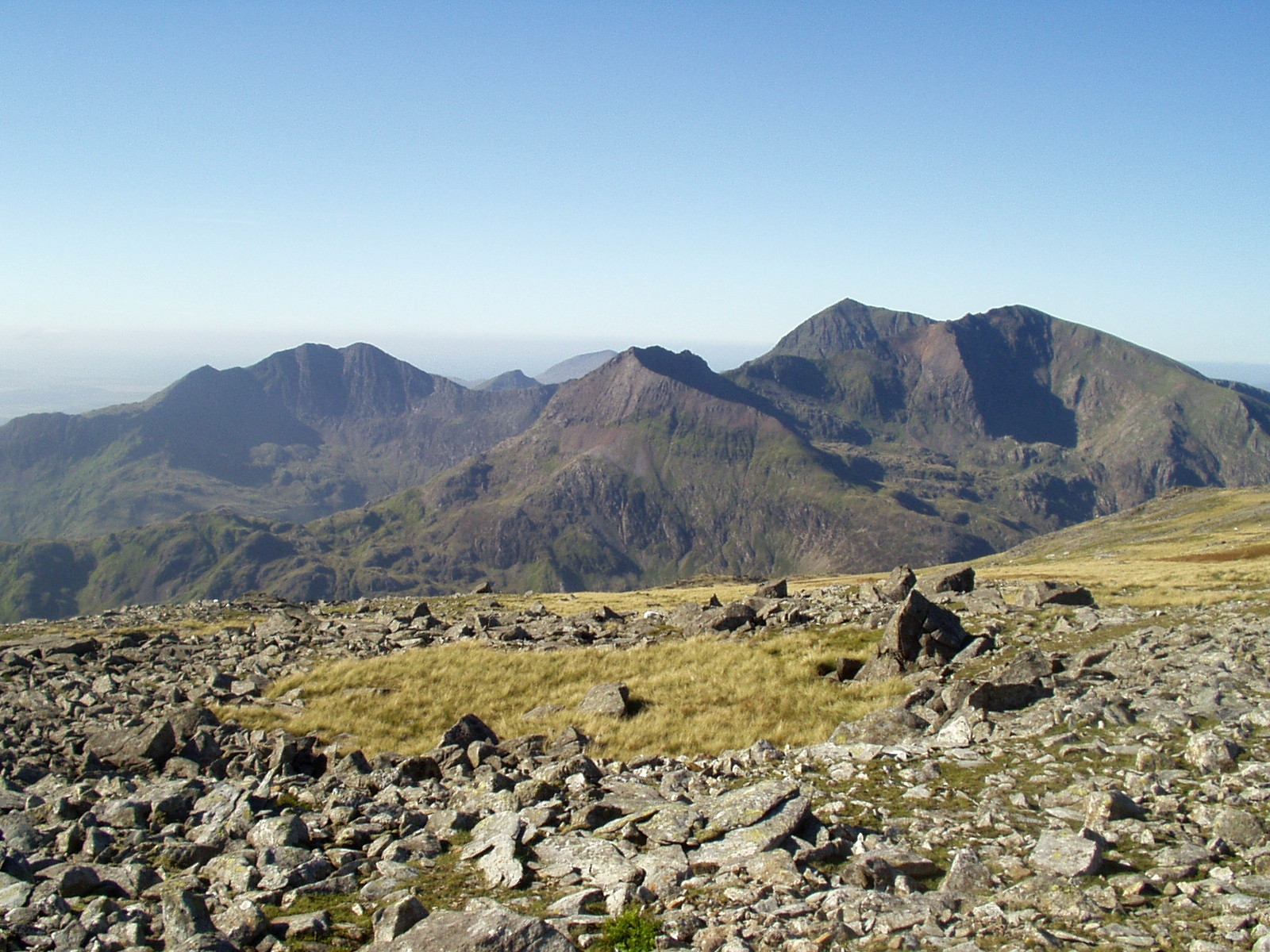
Snowdon

=== Journey to London ===
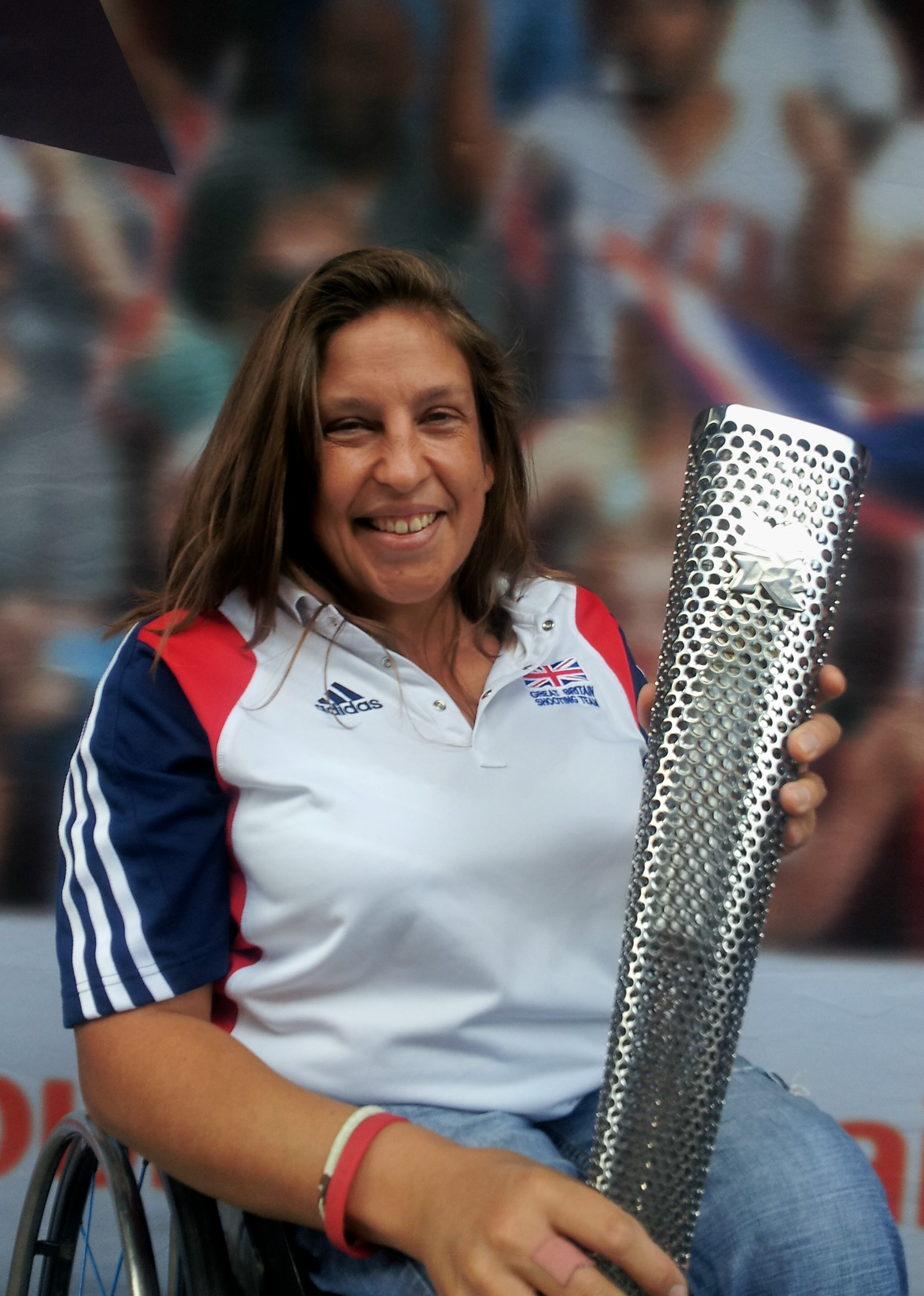
Ann Wild, a British Paralympian, with the torch.

On 28 August 2012 a ceremony was held at Stoke Mandeville Stadium, in honour of Stoke Mandeville's significance to the Paralympic movement, where the four national flames were united in a cauldron at precisely 8:12 pm (20:12) to form a single flame for the relay. The four flames were brought into the stadium by dignitaries, including English model Katie Piper (who began to campaign for burns victims after having acid thrown in her face in 2009) and Scottish amateur boxer Jonjo Look (who had a leg amputated and replaced by a prosthesis following an accident filling a gas canister).

The flame travelled a 92-mile (148-kilometre) route to the Olympic Stadium in a 24-hour relay, with 580 torchbearers working in teams of five. It travelled through iconic areas of London such as Abbey Road and London Zoo. Poor weather caused a two-hour delay on the Wednesday before the Games; parts of the route were modified to help ensure it would reach the stadium in time, while a backup flame was taken straight to the stadium as a contingency. However, as the opening ceremony's parade of nations took longer than expected, the flame was able to arrive at Olympic Stadium in time.

=== End of relay ===
The final three torchbearers represented three generations of Paralympic athletes. The torch entered the Olympic Stadium via a zipline attached to ArcelorMittal Orbit, carried by Joe Townsend, a former Royal Marine with amputated legs. Townsend represented the future as an athlete planning to compete in 2016 Summer Paralympics, a plan that came to fruition when he represented Great Britain in triathlon in Rio. He passed the torch to David Clarke, long-time captain of Britain's Five-a-side football team, representing the present. With his guide, Clarke passed the torch to Margaret Maughan, the winner of Great Britain's first gold medal at the 1960 Summer Paralympics, representing the past.

== Route in the UK ==

August 24
1. London
August 25
2. Belfast
August 26
3. Edinburgh
August 27
4. Cardiff
August 28
5. Stoke Mandeville
August 29
6. Olympic Stadium

== The Torches ==
The Paralympic torch was designed by Edward Barber and Jay Osgerby, who had also designed the Summer Olympic torch. It was intended to have a "modern" and "innovative" look, and was constructed with an aluminium alloy skin that is perforated to help with heat dissipation and grip. The torch also had a reflective finish, allowing it to match its surroundings and provide better visibility at night.

== See also ==
- 2012 Summer Olympics torch relay
- 2010 Winter Paralympics torch relay
- 2008 Summer Paralympics torch relay
