= 2008 Summer Paralympics torch relay =

XIII Paralympic Games
- Host city: Beijing, China
- Countries visited: China
- Torchbearers: 900
- Theme: Transcendence, Integration, Sharing
- Start date: August 28, 2008
- End date: September 6, 2008

The torch relay for the 2008 Summer Paralympic Games was held between August 28 and September 6 in eleven cities, and also included the tomb of Yellow Emperor.

== Planned route ==
In 2007, the Beijing Organizing Committee for the Olympic Games announced the torch relay route, composed of three parts:

- The International Route, which includes Vancouver and Whistler (the host cities of the 2010 Winter Paralympic Games), London (the host city of the 2012 Summer Paralympic Games), Sochi (the host city of the 2014 Winter Paralympic Games),Macau and Hong Kong (the co-host NPCs of the 2008 Summer Paralympics);
- The route of Modern China, which includes Beijing, Shenzhen, Chongqing, Wuhan, Shanghai, Qingdao, Dalian and Tianjin; and
- The route of Ancient China, which includes Beijing, Huangdiling (The Tomb of Yellow Emperor), Xi'an, Hohhot, Ürümqi, Chengdu, Changsha, Nanjing and Luoyang.

== Change of the route ==
In July 2008, the Beijing Games' Organizing Committee announced that the planned four international torch relay cities and four national cities for the Paralympic Games had been cancelled. The Committee stated that the relay was being cancelled to enable the Chinese government to "focus on the rescue and relief work" following the Sichuan earthquake.

Despite the officially stated reason for the cancellation, The Guardian attributed it to China's wish to avoid "a repeat of the protests" which had occurred in a number of cities around the world during the Olympics torch relay. Similarly, The Times wrote: "China has cancelled the international leg of the Paralympic torch relay, which was due to pass through London, in an apparent attempt to avoid similar protests to those that dogged the Olympic torch’s global tour." Reuters reported simply: "China, whose Beijing Olympic torch relay was dogged by protest overseas, on Wednesday cancelled the international leg of the Paralympic torch relay, giving the devastating Sichuan earthquake as the reason."

Details of the Chinese routes: Lighting ceremony, Ancient Chinese route, Modern Chinese route, Opening ceremony

The relay started from Tiantan on August 28 and then divided to two parallel lines before coming together in Beijing:

=== The route of Modern China ===
1. Beijing
2. Shenzhen
3. Wuhan
4. Shanghai
5. Qingdao
6. Dalian
7. Beijing

=== The route of Ancient China ===
1. Beijing
2. Xi'an
3. Hohhot
4. Changsha
5. Nanjing
6. Luoyang
7. Beijing

== Lighting ==
- Date: August 28, 2008
- Place: Tiantan, Beijing, China
- Host and hostess in post-ceremony and pre-ceremony: Pu Cunxin, Yang Lan
- Host of the ceremony: Guo Jinlong, Mayor of Beijing, Executive President of the Beijing Organizing Committee for the Olympic Games
- Speeches:
  - Deng Pufang, President of the Chinese Disabled Person's Association, Executive President of the Beijing Organizing Committee for the Olympic Games
  - Philip Craven, President of the International Paralympic Committee
  - Liu Qi, President of the Beijing Organizing Committee for the Olympic Games
- Gather Flame: Jiang Xintian
- Urn Holder: Jin Jing, a famous Paralympic athlete
- Lighting the Flame: Liu Qi
- Cauldron Lighter and Begin Announcer: Wen Jiabao, Premier of People's Republic of China

== Relay summary ==
Route	City	Date	Place	Start from	Ends at	Length (km)	Torchbearers (disabled torchbearers)	First torchbearer	First torchbearer's title	Last torchbearer	Last torchbearer's title	References
The Route of Ancient China	Xi'an	Aug 29, 2008	On the city wall	Tower of East Gate	Barbicans of the South Gate	3.1	70(11)	Zhang Hui	one of China's National Top Ten Disabled Athletes	Li Huimin	a disabled entrepreneur	
The Route of Ancient China	Huhehaote	Aug 30, 2008		Genghis Khan Square	Hohhot Stadium	3.1	70	Yang Zhimin	Chairman of the Disabled People Association of Inner Mongolia	Chen Guoyi	Disabled entrepreneur	
The Route of Ancient China	Changsha	Aug 31, 2008		Changsha Women's and Children's Center	Hunan Swimming Center	3	70(13)	Zhu Weimin	Swimming Gold Medalist in 1996 Summer Paralympics	Tan Yuehua	Disabled Police	
The Route of Ancient China	Nanjing	Sep 2, 2008		Boai Square, Zhongshan Tomb	Jinshuiqiao Square, Ming Xiao Tomb	3	60(12)	Hou Jingjing	First wheelchair female doctor of china, vice professor of Nanjing Normal University	Zhou Zengfu	Coach of Paralympic Athletic	
The Route of Ancient China	Luoyang	Sep 4, 2008	Longmen Grotto	Longmen Grotto	Longmen Stone Square	3	60(9)	Zhu Hongyan	WR holder and Paralympic Gold Medalist	Liu Zhengwei	Executive secretary of the Luoyang Disable Persons' Association	
The Route of Modern China	Shenzhen	Aug 30, 2008	Mountain Lotus	Statue of Deng Xiaoping	Baiyi Square	3.1	70(20%±)	Liu Hong	4th in Women's 20 km Walk in Beijing Olympic	Shen Jianping	Photographer with one arm	
The Route of Modern China	Wuhan	Aug 31, 2008	Wuhan Economic and Technology Development Zone	Wuhan Sports Center Stadium	Wuhan Sports Center Gymnasium	3	60(10)	Cheng Yu	Bronze Medalist of Women's Single TT6 and Gold Medallist of Women's Team TT6 of 1988 Summer Paralympics	Wen Qin	Athletic Gold Medallists of FESPIC Games	
The Route of Modern China	Shanghai	Sep 1, 2008	Songjiang New City	Shanghai Institute of Foreign Trade	Shanghai Sunshine Recover Center	3	60(10)	Zhao Jihong	Athletic Gold Medallist at the 1984 Summer Paralympics	Pang Jiaying	Swimming Silver Medalists and Bronze medalists of 2008 Beijing Olympics	
The Route of Modern China	Qingdao	Sep 2, 2008		Square of the Qingdao Olympic Sailing Center	May 4th Square	4.25(1 km over the sea)	70(20%)	Wu Chunmiao	Gold Medalist of Women's 200m T11 in 2004 Athens Paralympics	Zhou Yafei	Bronze Medalists of Women's 4X100m Medley Relay in 2008 Beijing Olympics	
The Route of Modern China	Dalian	Sep 3, 2008		Xinghai Square	Dalian Forest Park	3.8	70(14)	Li Yang	Chairman of the Dalian Disable Person's Association	Li Jinrui	Vice Chairman of CCP Dalian Committee	
Beijing		Sep 5, 2008	China Millennium Monument and Summer Palace	China Millennium Monument	17 hole bridge of Summer Palace(include a "之" Shape over sea relay)	6.5	120(30%)	Wang Juan	fencer	Zhou Hua	President of Beijing East City District Special Education School	
Beijing		Sep 6, 2008	Chaoyang Park	Lihua Square	Chaoyang Park Beach Volleyball Field	5.5	120(40)	Xu Yuansheng	Coach of China Wheelchair Basketball Team	Zhao Jihua	Former President of China National Disabled People Association	

== Final relay in main stadium ==
Chinese athletes with disabilities carried the torch in Beijing National Stadium during the Games' Opening Ceremony. Jin Jing carried the torch into the stadium, before it was passed on to Paralympic gold medallists Wu Yunhu, Zhang Hongwei, Zhang Haidong, Sun Changting and Hou Bin. Hou then pulled himself up on a rope to the top of the stadium to light the Paralympic flame.

== See also ==
- 2008 Summer Olympics torch relay
- 2010 Winter Paralympics torch relay
- 2022 Winter Olympics torch relay
- 2022 Winter Paralympics torch relay
