= Jeff Adams =

Canadian Paralympic athlete

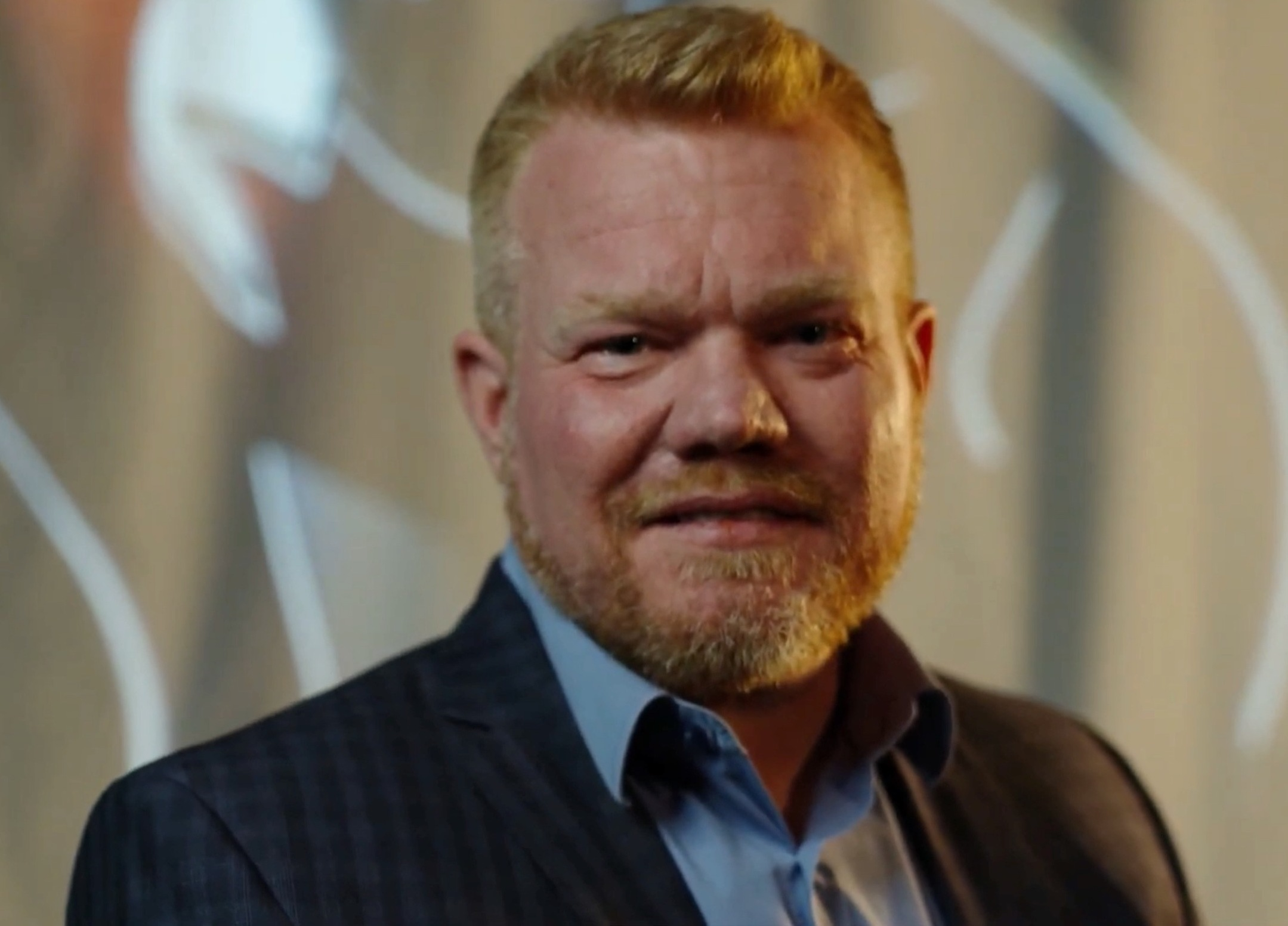
- Adams in 2021

Personal information
- Full name: Jeffrey Adams
- Born: November 15, 1970 (age 56) Mississauga, Ontario, Canada
Medal record
Men's athletics
Representing Canada
Paralympic Games
Gold medal – first place	1996 Atlanta	800m T53
Gold medal – first place	2000 Sydney	800m T53
Gold medal – first place	2000 Sydney	1500m T53
Silver medal – second place	1992 Barcelona	800m TW4
Silver medal – second place	1992 Barcelona	4×400m relay TW3-TW4
Silver medal – second place	1996 Atlanta	400m T53
Silver medal – second place	2000 Sydney	400m T53
Bronze medal – third place	1988 Seoul	800m 5-6
Bronze medal – third place	1988 Seoul	1500m 5-6
Bronze medal – third place	1996 Atlanta	4×400m relay T52-T53
Bronze medal – third place	2000 Sydney	5000m T53
Bronze medal – third place	2000 Sydney	4×100m relay T52-T53
Bronze medal – third place	2004 Athens	400m T53

Jeffrey Adams (born November 15, 1970, in Mississauga, Ontario) is a Canadian lawyer, and a former Paralympian, a six-time world champion in wheelchair sports.

== Competitive racing ==
Adams competed at six consecutive Summer Paralympics from 1988 to 2008, winning a total of three gold, four silver, and six bronze medals. At the 1988 Summer Paralympics he won two bronze medals, one in the 800m race and one in the 1500m race. Four years later at the Barcelona Games he won two silvers, one in the 800m race and one as part of the 4 × 400 m relay. At the 1996 Summer Paralympics he won gold in the 800 m, silver in the 400 m, and bronze in the 4×400 m relay. Four years later, at the Sydney games, he won five medals, a gold in the 800 m and 1500 m, a silver in the 400 m and a bronze in the 5000 m and 4×100 m. At the 2004 Paralympics he won a bronze in the 400 m race. Adams was coached by Peter Eriksson.

== Post-competition ==
In 2002, Adams ascended the 1,776 steps of the CN Tower in a specially designed wheelchair; in 2004, he climbed the Acropolis.

In March 2010, he was a torchbearer during the 2010 Winter Paralympics torch relay.

In 2012 Adams was part of the broadcast crew on Channel 4's coverage of the 2012 Summer Paralympics in London.

Adams is additionally a motivational speaker.

He is an inductee into the Canadian Disability Hall of Fame (1997, then the Terry Fox Hall of Fame). In 2018, he was awarded the Order of Sport, marking his induction into Canada's Sports Hall of Fame (2018).

== Personal life ==
Adams underwent radiation therapy for cancer as a child, and aftermath of the treatment led to a spinal injury at age 9 that paralysed him. After retiring from competition, Adams and business partner Christian Bagg co-launched Marvel Wheelchairs with Cervélo Cycles, producing adjustable wheelchairs for everyday use. After Cervélo was unable to secure bridge financing for debt to suppliers, Marvel was taken over and unsuccessful attempts were made to sell it by Cervélo. Cervélo was taken over by PON, and Adams and Bagg launched a new company making wheelchairs called ICON in 2010. An appearance on the CBC reality show Dragons' Den led to a new partnership with a manufacturer, Multimatic, to produce the wheelchairs designed by ICON.

Through much of his career, Adams lived in Brampton, Ontario.
