= 2002 Winter Paralympics torch relay =

VII Paralympic Winter Games
- Host city: Salt Lake City, Utah, United States
- Start date: March 1, 2002
- End date: March 7, 2002

The 2002 Winter Paralympics torch relay, known as the Journey of Fire, was held between March 1 and March 7, leading up to the 2002 Winter Paralympics in Salt Lake City, Utah, United States. Paralympic flames were lit in 15 Utah cities and merged in Salt Lake City, with the resulting fire then carried around the city to the opening ceremony on March 7.

== Relay ==
Map showing the locations of lighting ceremonies.

The concept for the Paralympic torch relay was announced on December 12, 2001. Initially, 16 Utah communities were selected to host local celebrations to light their own flames. However, only 15 actually carried out their celebrations since North Ogden ended up withdrawing.

Thus, 15 individual flames were lit in these communities in a separated form, respecting a diversity and uniqueness of rituals.As it did not exist until 2012, the idea of an ancestral site for the Paralympic Games.There was no standard procedure on the part of the torch relay.The SLOC president Mitt Romney encouraged the various communities to ignite their fires in their own unique way and methods. For example, the flame in Springville was lit by a "mountain man" capable of igniting a fire with his bare hands in six seconds. At the Salt Lake County Ice Center in Murray, Canadian sledge hockey captain Todd Nicholson activated the flame by scoring a goal.

Between March 1 to March 6, the 15 flames were lit around Utah.The first flame we lit on Friday, March 1 in Woods Cross, with additional lighting ceremonies taking place later the same evening in Brigham City, American Fork, and Moab. Four more flames were ignited on March 2, in Heber City, Kaysville, Cedar City, and Sandy. On March 4, another four flames were lit in Park City, St. George, Layton, and West Valley City. The final three flames were lit on March 5 in Murray, Centerville, and Springville.

On the evening of March 6, the 15 community flames were merged into a single cauldron in front of the Salt Lake City and County Building thus beginning your final journey to the Rice–Eccles Olympic Stadium, starting the morning of the next day . In the early hours of the following morning, the last legs of the relay were held on the front of the Delta Center and the Utah State Capitol, through Liberty Park, and to Shriners Hospital on its way to the opening ceremony at Rice–Eccles Stadium. At the list of the 100 last torchbearers who ran across the city included Utah savant Kim Peek, who inspired the film Rain Man. The flame was brought into the stadium by Erik Weihenmayer, the first blind person to climb Mount Everest, and his guide dog. Weihenmayer passed the torch to skiers Muffy Davis and Chris Waddell, who lit the cauldron.
