= 2016 Summer Paralympics torch relay =

XV Paralympic Games
- Host city: Rio de Janeiro, Brazil
- Countries visited: Great Britain, Brazil
- Start date: September 1, 2016
- End date: September 7, 2016

The 2016 Summer Paralympics torch relay was a 7-day event leading up to the 2016 Summer Paralympic Games in Rio de Janeiro. It began on September 1, 2016, in Brasília and concluded at the Games' opening ceremony on September 7. The Paralympic torch relay began with five individual flames being relayed to a city in each of the five regions of Brazil. These flames, as well as a sixth flame lit in Stoke Mandeville, Great Britain, were united to form a single Paralympic flame, which was relayed through Rio on 6 and 7 September 2016 en route to its lighting at the Maracanã during the opening ceremony.

== The torch ==
The Rio 2016 Paralympic torch was unveiled on December 13, 2015. It was created from the same design concept as the Rio 2016 Olympic torch, which celebrates the essence of Rio 2016—passion and transformation. The torch is able to open and close. When closed, the Olympic and Paralympic torches look the same, demonstrating the equality of the two torches, and when opened, the character of the torches reveal themselves.

According to Rio 2016 President Carlos Nuzman, "The Paralympic Torch’s sinuous curves represent the highs and lows in the life of a Paralympic athlete, celebrating their determination and achievements. Its quadrangular shape refers to the four Paralympic values – courage, determination, inspiration and equality – which are also written in Braille on the torch, along with the words 'Rio 2016 Paralympic Games Torch Relay.'"

During the relay, when the flame is passed from one torchbearer to another its segments open upwards, symbolizing a person's body stretching its boundaries. The segments come from the elements of the Brazilian flair and the host city's nature represent with the different colors, but these colors were different and more warmer, symbolizing the joy and warmth typical to the Brazilian people. The Paralympic torch’s sinuous curves represent the highs and lows in the life of a Paralympic athlete, celebrating their determination and achievements. The quadrangular shape refers to the four Paralympic values – courage, determination, inspiration and equality – which are also written in Braille on the torch, along with the words “Rio 2016 Paralympic Games Torch Relay.”. Like the Olympic torch, the curves had colors that meant the values of this edition of the Games, The orange represents the courage of the Paralympic athletes, red represents the determination and the warmth and welcome of the Brazilian people. The purple represented the inspiration created by the Paralympic sport and also the expectations created in the country with the event and what the event could accomplish in Brazilian society. The dark blue represented equality, emphasized in the current Brazilian Constitution that has existed since 1988, and in the holding of the Olympic and Paralympic Games in the same city and in equal conditions since that year. The shape of the segments represents the esplanades (Calçadão in Portuguese) of the beaches of Copacabana and Ipanema. The axis of the torch expresses unity and diversity.

== Relay ==
=== Locations ===
Cities visited in the 2016 Summer Paralympics Torch Relay:
- Brasília - September 1
- Belém - September 2
- Natal - September 3
- Joinville - September 4
- São Paulo - September 5
- Rio de Janeiro - September 6–7

According to the classification made by the Brazilian Institute of Geography and Statistics, the 27 Brazilian states are divided into 5 Geographic Regions (Central-West, Southeast, South, Northeast and North) and given the short time to carry out the activities, those first 5 cities that received the Reference Centers of the Brazilian Paralympic Committee and also due to their historical value for the Paralympic Movement in the host country.Along their own symbolisms and motives, each city that the relay included celebrated a different Paralympic and Rio 2016 value: in Brasília, it was the equality; in Belém, determination; in Natal, inspiration; in São Paulo, transformation; in Joinville, courage; and in Rio de Janeiro as the host city, passion.

=== Heritage Ceremony ===
On September 2, 2016, Stoke Mandeville, Great Britain, the birthplace of the Paralympic Movement, held a ceremony for the lighting of the Heritage Flame. The flame was combined with the five Brazilian flames in Rio de Janeiro on September 6, which formed the Rio 2016 Paralympic flame.

=== End of the relay ===
After the Paralympic flame was created, it was then carried around Rio from September 6 to September 7. On the day of the opening ceremony, 1984 Paralympic gold medalist Marcia Malsar was carrying the torch at the Maracanã Stadium when she slipped and fell on the rain-covered floor. Once she recovered from the fall, she smiled, waved at the audience, and handed off the torch. Clodoaldo Silva was the last torchbearer, and lit the cauldron.
