= Hou Jingjing =

Chinese scholar

Hou Jingjing (Chinese: 侯晶晶, born 1975) was the first Chinese woman in a wheelchair to earn a doctorate. She is currently employed at Nanjing Normal University.

== Life and career ==
Jingjing was born in 1975 in the Dangtu County of the Anhui Province. She was reportedly gifted from a young age. At 11 years old, she was diagnosed as paralyzed from the waist down and had to drop out of school. After dropping out, Jingjing was home-schooled. She required frequent treatment, which often resulted in her missing classes and having to catch up on her own.

Jingjing received her BA from Anhui University in 1997. She was accepted by Nanjing Normal University in 1998 for her postgraduate studies, receiving the highest marks among everyone who took the application test. She received her MA in English Linguistics in 2001. In 2004, she completed her PhD program at NNU and was hired there as a professor in the university's school of education science.

Hou Jingjing is a member of the Chinese Communist Party, and was a delegate to its 17th National Congress. She has published multiple articles in scholarly journals and has written two books on education. Jingijing has received multiple honors and awards for her work.
