= 2010 Winter Paralympics torch relay =

IX Paralympic Winter Games
- Host city: Vancouver, Canada
- Countries visited: Canada
- Torchbearers: More than 600 approx.
- Start date: March 3, 2010
- End date: March 12, 2010
- Torch designer: Leo Obstbaum

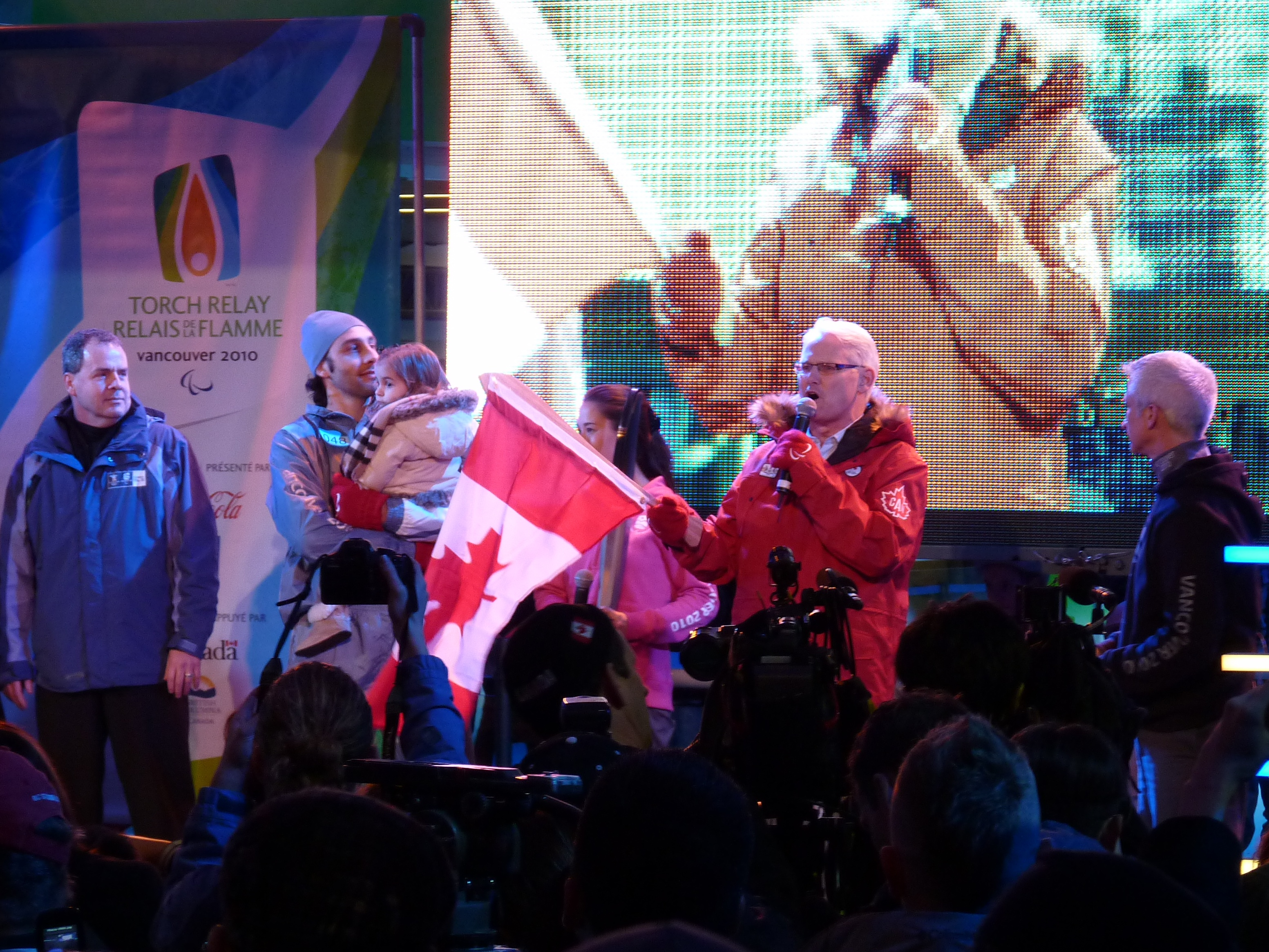
BC Premier Gordon Campbell and Roberto Luongo at Robson Square on March 11, 2010.

The 2010 Winter Paralympics Torch Relay was a 10-day event leading up to the 2010 Winter Paralympic Games in Vancouver. It began on March 3, 2010, in Ottawa and concluded at the Games' opening ceremony on March 12. Held entirely within Canada, the host country, it has been described by the Vancouver Organizing Committee for the 2010 Olympic and Paralympic Winter Games as "an important event to connect Canadians to the Games", by "demonstrating the fire inside each individual and how it inspires others".

== Route ==
The Paralympic Flame was lit at a ceremony in Ottawa, with the participation of torchbearers representing each province and territory of Canada. Setting out from Ottawa, the Torch virtually traveled to Quebec City on March 4, Toronto on March 5, Esquimalt and Victoria on March 6, Squamish on March 7, Whistler on March 8, Lytton and Hope on March 9, before spending the final three days in Vancouver. On March 10, it visited Riley Park and Maple Ridge, then the campus of the University of British Columbia on the following day. On March 12, after being borne through downtown Vancouver, the Flame was to be taken to BC Place Stadium for the Games' opening ceremony.

== Celebration Communities ==
The Organising Committee stated that "[t]his relay is distinct from typical relays as it will happen in and around the Celebration Communities". A celebration ceremony will be organised at each stop of the relay, involving the community.

In Ottawa, the celebration was a Lighting Ceremony, during which "the local First Nations communities of the Algonquins of Pikwàkanagàn and Kitigan Zibi Anishinabeg" would light the Flame. The Torch would then travel to Parliament Hill. At the end of the day, it was to be extinguished, to be relit on March 4 by the local First Nations of its next stop.

In Quebec City, celebrations were held on the campus of Laval University; in Toronto, on Nathan Phillips Square; and in Esquimalt, at the Archie Browning Sports Centre. The Flame was then to be taken to Victoria by water taxi and on an "Aboriginal traditional canoe", for celebrations at Ship Point (Victoria Inner Harbour). In Squamish, celebrations were slated to take place on Cleveland Avenue; in Whistler, at Whistler Village Square, after being carried, "on various modes of transport, such as skis and a snowboard", "to the peak of the Blackcomb Mountain and taken on the Peak 2 Peak Gondola to Whistler Mountain". In Lytton, celebrations "will take place on 4th street at Fraser", and in Hope, at Memorial Park, on Wallace Street. Finally, in Vancouver, they were organised to take place at Riley Park Community Centre, Spirit Square, the University of British Columbia and Robson Square.

== Torchbearers ==
The Flame was scheduled to be borne by "approximately 600 torchbearers" including "Canadians from all walks of life" as well as athletes.

The first bearer of the torch was single-leg amputee marathon runner Rick Ball, triple world record holder.

Other torchbearers:

- Robert Steadward, founding president of the International Paralympic Committee from 1989 to 2001
- Rick Mercer, broadcaster, comedian and commentator who "has significantly raised the profile of Paralympic sports through his work"
- Jasmine Gerein, daughter of Clayton Gerein - seven-time Paralympic gold medallist who was a torchbearer at the 2010 Winter Olympics torch relay and died on January 9, 2010
- Chelsea Gotell, successful Paralympic swimmer who broke two world records at the 2008 Summer Paralympics
- Erica Noon, eighteen-year-old single-arm amputee para-swimmer
- Simon Koomak, golfer suffering from brittle bone disease
- Jared Funk, two-time Paralympian wheelchair rugby player
- Rick Goodfellow, "executive director of the non-profit organization Challenge Community Vocational Alternatives; provider of employment support and training to people with disabilities in Yukon"
- Colin MacLeod, ice sledge hockey player with spina bifida and hydrocephalus
- Justin Hines, singer-songwriter with Larsen Syndrome
- Dean Bergeron, four-time Paralympian hockey player
- Tara Weber, Canada’s first national television correspondent to use a wheelchair
- Katherine Elkin, competitive para-swimmer
- Sabrina Pettinicchi Durepos, four-time Paralympian wheelchair basketball player
- Arnold Boldt, three-time Paralympian track and field athlete
- Justine Belair, former competitive figure skater, representing the Algonquins of Pikwakanagan First Nations
- Visually impaired four-time track and field Paralympian France Gagné
- Jeff Adams, six-time Paralympian, "one of Canada's leading wheelchair athletes" in track and field
- Brian Gray, a local community coach in hockey and several other sports in Esquimalt; he has cerebral palsy
- Peter Lawless, director of the Coaches Association of British Columbia and Coaches of Canada, founder of "the first wheelchair athletic training group on Vancouver Island"; he has trained several successful athletes with disabilities
- Matt Hallat, single-leg amputee alpine skier at the 2006 Winter Paralympics
- Andrea Drynock, successful double-leg amputee former competitive swimmer
- Leszek Sibilski, Polish sociologist, cyclist
- Heather Stewin, visually impaired founder of "Storytime in the Park", "a program dedicated to addressing literacy issues in the community" in Hope, British Columbia
- Priya (Jasdeep) Sekhon, paraplegic fourteen-year-old
- Jennifer McKenzie, equestrian competitor at the 2008 Summer Paralympics
- Bonita Sawatzky, associate professor in orthopaedics (in the spine division) at the University of British Columbia, competitive cyclist with a disability
- Laurel Crosby, Canadian flagbearer at the 1988 and 1992 Summer Paralympics; former president of the Canadian Paralympic Committee

=== Quebec City, March 4 ===
- Denis Laflamme; the Manager, governmental affairs and health policies for Pfizer Canada

=== Toronto, March 5 ===
- Johannah Jackson, daughter of Robert Jackson, one of the founding fathers of the Canadian Paralympic Movement
- Lane Sargeant, London Blizzard Sledge Hockey player, of London, Ontario
- Tara Weber, television correspondent who uses a wheelchair.
- Jody Mitic, Afghanistan veteran, former Ottawa MP.
- Carl Ludwig, Mississauga Cruises Sledge Hockey player, of Mississauga, Ontario

=== Victoria, March 6 ===
- Janet Dunn, Paralympic movement coach and rehabilitation volunteer for over 25 years

=== Squamish, March 7 ===
- Blair McIntosh, Canadian Paralympic Committee 2010 Chef de Mission for Team Canada and Team Ontario

=== Whistler, March 8 ===
- Ken Melamed, Mayor of Whistler
- Jason Dunkerly, three-time Paralympic runner with a visual impairment

=== Vancouver, Hillcrest and Riley Park, March 10 ===
- Jane Blaine, Executive Director for BC Blind Sports and Recreation Association and also the Executive Director/CEO for Canadian Blind Sports

=== Vancouver, University of British Columbia, March 11 ===
- George Hungerford, Olympic rower

=== Vancouver, downtown, March 11 and 12 ===
- Athena Cooper, Web Administrator and Designer at 2010 Legacies Now
- Aiden McKee. contributor to book With Glowing Hearts
- Terrie Moore, co-chair of the CPC Classification Task Force, Executive Director of SportAbility BC
- Bianca Solterbeck, journalist with ShawTV
- Walter Wu, partially blind Paralympic swimmer, Terry Fox Hall of Fame inductee
- Eron Main, Secretary General of the International Wheelchair Rugby Federation, on the Board of the Canadian Wheelchair Sports Association
- Tracey Keith, wife of Steven Keith, Director, Olympic Activation at Suncor Energy
- Michelle Stilwell, Canadian Paralympian, wheelchair racing and wheelchair basketball
- Senator Joyce Fairbairn, former Chair of "Friends of the Paralympics", chair of Canadian Paralympic Foundation
- Ozzie Sawicki, founder and president of Pozitive Results Sport Strategies Inc. Head Coach and Program Director for the Canadian Disabled Alpine Ski Team from 2000 to 2004, Head Coach of the Canadian Para-Athletics (Track and Field) Program with Athletics Canada, sits on Boards for the Canadian Paralympic Committee, Coaches of Canada, the Canadian Ski Coaches Federation, and Coach Alberta
- Jack Christie, sport journalist for the Georgia Straight
- Lauren Barwick, Canadian Paralympian, para-dressage equestrian
- Sonia Gaudet, Canadian Paralympian, wheelchair curling, ambassador for the Rick Hansen Foundation, CPC, VANOC
- Cindy Crapper, record-setting track and field thrower, member of the International Day for People with Disabilities Celebration, BC Sport Group, BCRPA, City of Vancouver's Sport Strategy, Active Communities Initiatives, CAAWS; Women in Leadership and a member of the British Columbia Recreation and Parks Association
- Josh Vander Vies, Canadian boccia player, Athlete Council Representation on the Canadian Paralympic Committee Board of Directors
- Elisabeth Walker-Young, four-time Paralympian, member of the Athlete and Coach Selection Committee for Para-swimming Swimming Canada, Classification Specialist for VANOC for the 2010 Olympic and Paralympic Winter Games

== See also ==
- 2008 Summer Paralympics torch relay
- 2010 Winter Olympics torch relay
