= Dilnigar Ilhamjan =

Chinese cross-country skier (born 2001)

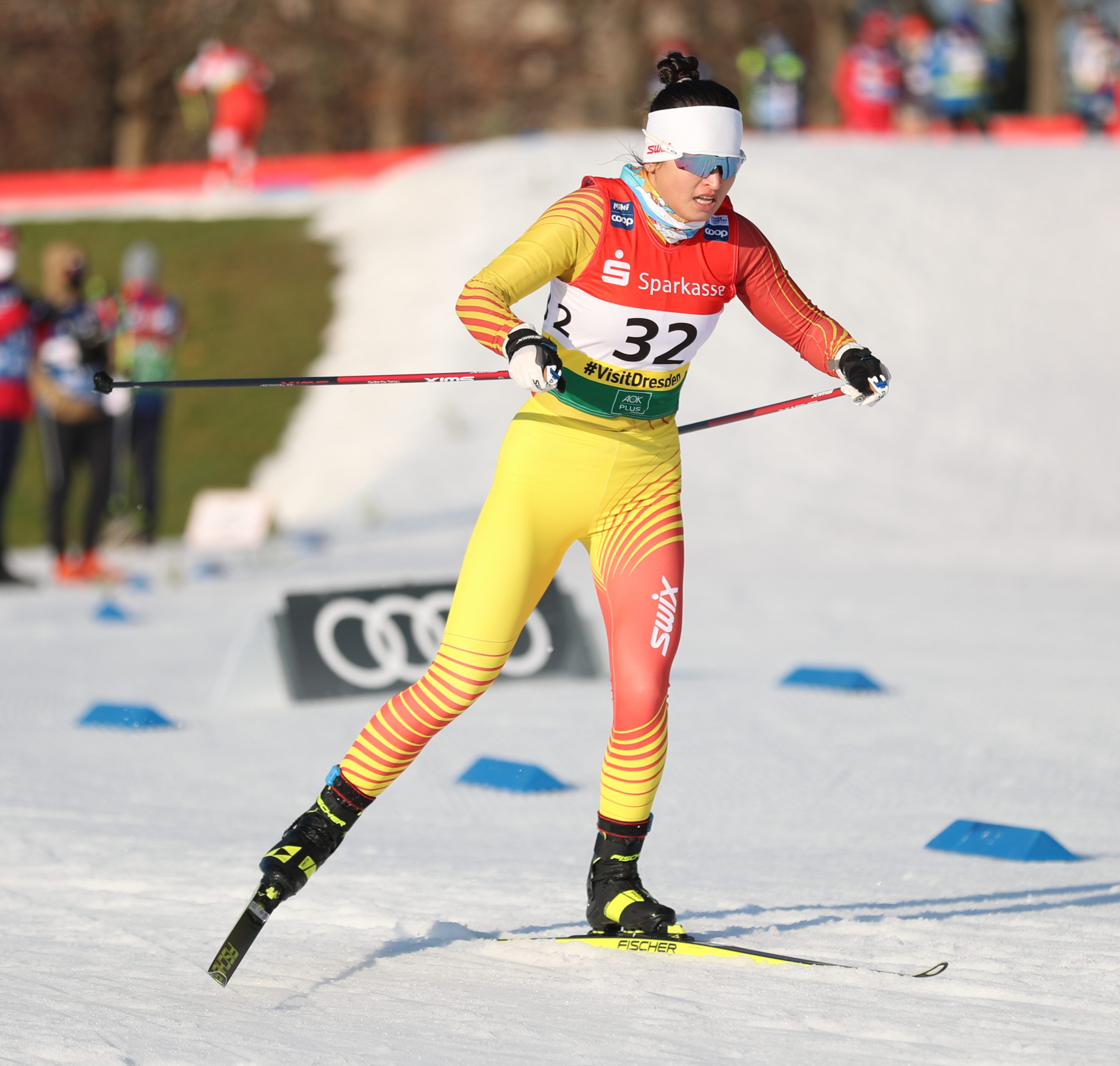
- Dilnigar at the FIS Cross-Country World Cup 2020 in Dresden

Personal information
- Born: 3 May 2001 (age 25) Altay City, Xinjiang, China

Uyghur name
- Uyghur: دىلنىگار ئىلھامجان
Transcriptions
- Latin Yëziqi: Dilnigar Ilhamjan

Chinese name
- Simplified Chinese: 迪妮格尔·衣拉木江
- Traditional Chinese: 迪妮格爾·衣拉木江
Transcriptions
Standard Mandarin
- Hanyu Pinyin: Dínīgé'ěr Yīlāmùjiāng

Sport
- Sport: Cross-country skiing
- Turned pro: 2017
Medal record
Women's cross-country skiing
Representing China
Asian Games
| Silver medal – second place | 2025 Harbin | 5 km freestyle |
| Bronze medal – third place | 2025 Harbin | Sprint |

Dilnigar Ilhamjan (Uyghur: دىلنىگار ئىلھامجان; born 3 May 2001), or Dinigeer Yilamujiang (Chinese: 迪妮格尔·衣拉木江), is a Chinese cross-country skier. An ethnic Uyghur from the far-northern city of Altay in Xinjiang, she is the first Chinese cross-country skier to win a medal in an FIS event. She made her maiden Olympic appearance during the 2022 Winter Olympics, where she was one of the two last torch bearers.

Dilnigar also served as a representative to the 19th Communist Youth League Congress.

== Personal life ==
Her father, who taught her to ski and is still her coach, received a bronze medal in the 1993 national cross-country skiing competition.

== Sports career ==
Originally competing as a track and field athlete, she started learning to ski when she was 12. She pursued cross-country skiing initially primarily as a hobby. In 2012 she started taking part in local competitive sports events as a long-distance runner. She first started skiing competitively in 2017. Norwegian coach Kristian Bjune Sveen travelled to Xinjiang to give her training, while Dilnigar also spent 3 years training in Norway herself, alongside Bayani Jialin, a Chinese skier of Kazakh ethnicity. She placed 2nd at the FIS China City Sprint Beijing 2019, as well as 2nd at the Norwegian Norgescup at Konnerud. This made her the first Chinese cross-country skier to win a medal in an FIS event.

In 2019, she won a silver medal at the FIS Beijing Cross Country Skiing Points Grand Prix.

=== 2022 Beijing Winter Olympics ===
At the 2022 Beijing Winter Olympics opening ceremony, she was one of the two last torch bearers, lighting the Olympic cauldron alongside Zhao Jiawen. She became the first Uyghur and the first from Altay, the likely origin of skiing, to light the cauldron.

Due to earlier backlash surrounding the Xinjiang re-education camps and persecution of Uyghurs in China, there was some speculation about the message China was intending to send with Dinigeer's selection. Her selection sparked condemnation from human rights groups accusing China of politicizing the Olympics. However, the International Olympic Committee welcomed and defended the decision of China to select her as one of the torchbearers of the opening ceremony and insisted that since she was one of the participants, she had the right to compete and take part in any ceremony.

She competed in the women's 15km skiathlon event and placed 43rd. After the match, she exited through a separate aisle, without passing through the mixed zone where she could be interviewed by the press. She was scheduled to race in the women's 4 x 5 km relay on 12 February, but never showed up. Unnamed sources claimed that she was physically and mentally exhausted from "having the eyes of the world on her". She participated in the women's 30km freestyle event on the last day of competition.

=== Later career ===
In 2024 she won gold in cross-country skiing and silver in the women's individual sprint (traditional technique) at the Chinese National Cross-Country Skiing Championship as well as a silver medal at the 2024 China National Winter Games double pursuit. She placed 36th in the 50 km classical race at the 2026 Winter Olympics.

== Political activities ==
In 2022 she was listed as an outstanding member of the Communist Youth League. She was a representative to the 19th Youth League Congress for Xinjiang Uygur Autonomous Region.

Olympic Games
| Preceded by Naomi Osaka | Final Olympic torchbearer Beijing 2022 along Zhao Jiawen | Succeeded by Teddy Riner and Marie-José Pérec |
| Preceded by Yuna Kim | Final Winter Olympic torchbearer Beijing 2022 along Zhao Jiawen | Succeeded by Deborah Compagnoni, Sofia Goggia, and Alberto Tomba |
