= Zhao Jiawen =

Chinese Nordic combined skier

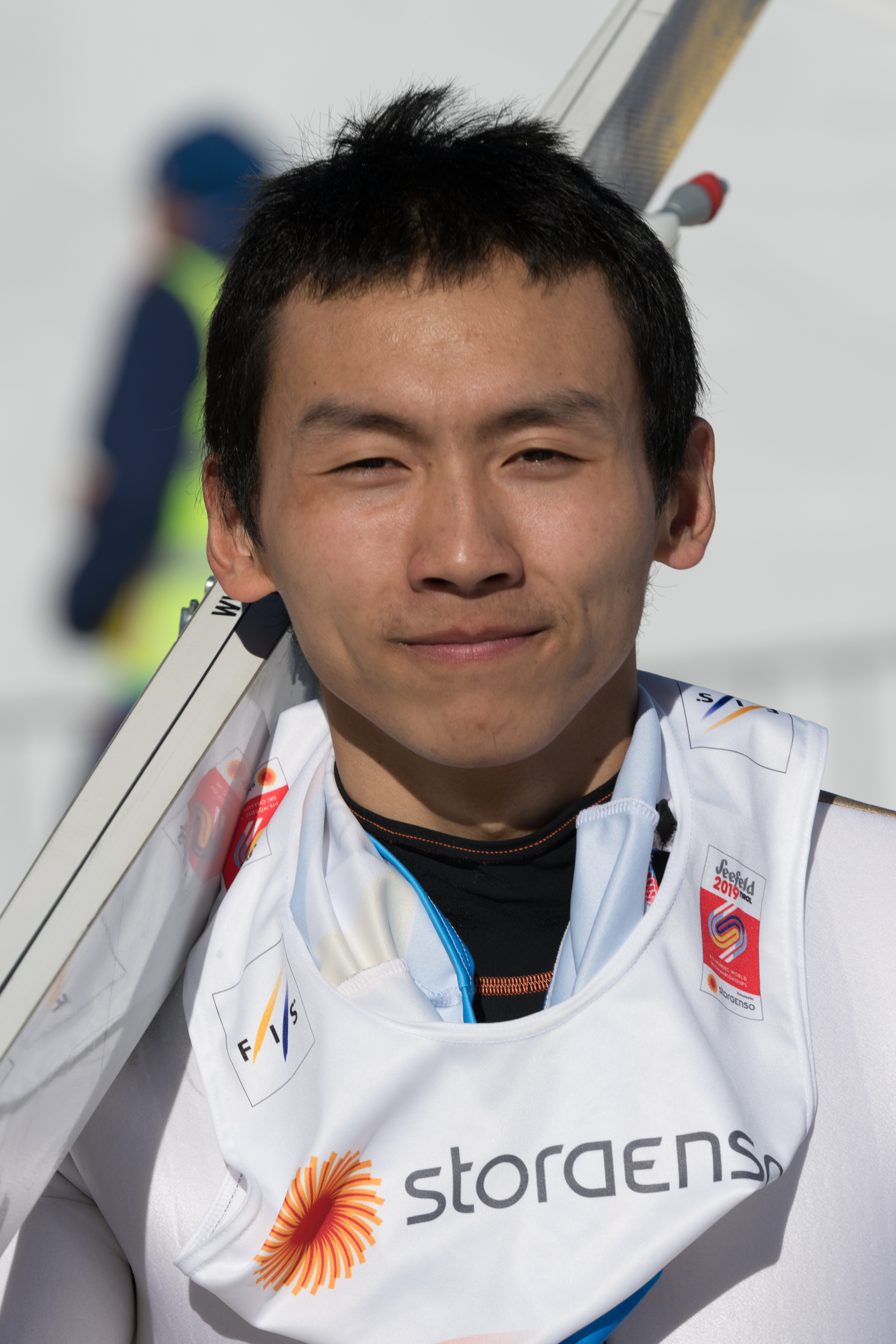
- Zhao in 2019

Personal information
- Born: 16 January 2001 (age 25) Heilongjiang, China

Sport
- Sport: Skiing
- Events: Nordic combined; Ski jumping

Zhao Jiawen (Chinese: 赵嘉文, born 16 January 2001) is a Chinese Nordic combined skier. Born in Heilongjiang, he qualified for the 2022 Winter Olympics, becoming the first Chinese athlete to compete in the sport at the Olympic level. He was one of the two last torch bearers alongside Dinigeer Yilamujiang. Zhao also competed at the 2026 Winter Olympics, in Nordic combined and ski jumping events.

Olympic Games
Preceded by Naomi Osaka	Final Olympic torchbearer Beijing 2022 along Dilnigar Ilhamjan	Succeeded by Teddy Riner and Marie-José Pérec
Preceded by Yuna Kim	Final Winter Olympic torchbearer Beijing 2022 along Dilnigar Ilhamjan	Succeeded by Deborah Compagnoni, Sofia Goggia, and Alberto Tomba
