= 2022 Winter Olympics torch relay =

- Host city: Beijing, China
- Countries visited: Greece, China
- Torchbearers: 1,200
- Theme: Welcome to the promise of the land of ice and snow and head towards a better future
- Start date: 18 October 2021
- End date: 4 February 2022

The 2022 Winter Olympics torch relay was run from 18 October 2021 until 4 February 2022. Having just began 71 days after the postponed 2020 Summer Olympics, the torch was lit in Olympia, Greece, the torch traveled to Athens in a car. and was handed to Beijing on 20 October. The Chinese leg ended in Beijing National Stadium, at the end of the opening ceremony. It was announced on 20 October 2021 that the Chinese leg had only three days, following a series of displays of the flame in cities around Beijing. The physical relay started on 2 February, at the morning of the first day of the Chinese New Year as stage 3. Unlike the previous relays (due to health and cost issues), the relay only visited the three venues clusters, the main sights of Beijing and the city of Zhangjiakou. The final torch was lit by long-distance runner Dilnigar Ilhamjan (Dinige'er Yilamujiang) and Nordic combined skier Zhao Jiawen.

== Relay ==
Activists staged a protest at the Olympic torch lighting ceremony in Greece.

The choice to have Qi Fabao, a People's Liberation Army commander famous for his participation in the 2020–2021 China–India skirmishes, be a torchbearer has been controversial with India launching a diplomatic boycott of the games as a result.

== Route in Greece ==

October 18
1. Olympia
October 19
1. Athens

== Route in China ==
=== Flame display leg (stage 1) ===
Division	Route	Map
Beijing	20 October (day 1): Beijing: Beijing Olympic Tower	2022 Winter Olympics torch relay is located in Beijing

=== Beijing municipal leg (stages 2 and 3) ===

February 2
1. Beijing
February 4
3. Yanqing
4. Beijing National Stadium

February 3
2. Zhangjiakou

== End of Torch Relay ==
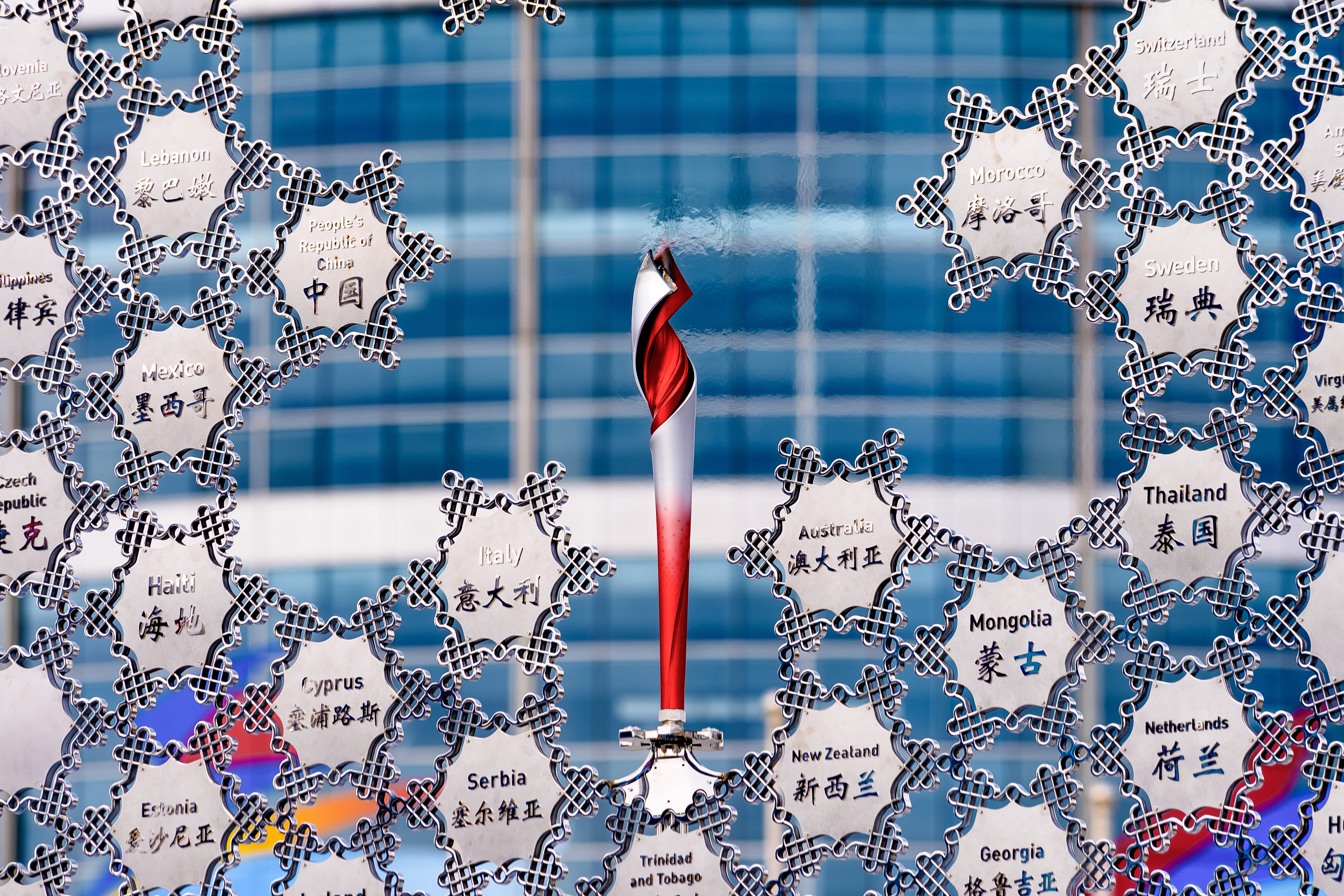
The cauldron in Yanqing

The relay ended after the 2022 Winter Olympics opening ceremony, when the Olympic Cauldron was lit by Altay Uyghur cross-country skier Dilnigar Ilhamjan, and Nordic combined skier Zhao Jiawen.

After the cauldron in the stadium was lit, the three venues clusters' cauldron was lit right after the end of the opening ceremony.

- Taizicheng Cluster - cauldron located at its central plaza. It was lit by the 19 y.o. free/slopestyle skier Wang Wenzhuo (王文卓) from Zhangjiakou.
- Yanqing Cluster - permanent cauldron located in Yanqing Main Plaza. It was lit by the 10 y.o. short track speed skater Wang Hanyi (王瀚一) from Yanqing, who ranked first place in 500m event at Beijing municipal short track championships.
- Beijing Cluster - The main cauldron is located between the Nation Stadium and the Ice Cube. It was lit by Zhang Junying (张军英), an architect and former olympic cycling racer, she was among the group of designers of the National Stadium project and a volunteer of the 2022 Winter Olympics.
