= Leo Obstbaum =

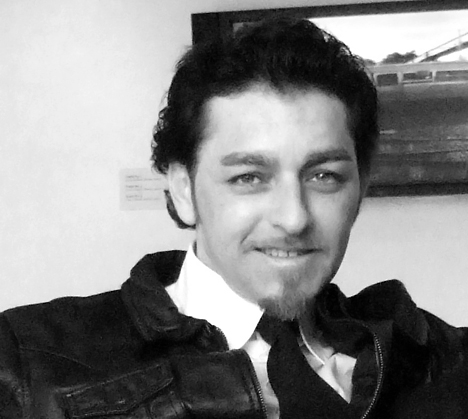
- Born: October 26, 1969; Buenos Aires, Argentina
- Died: August 21, 2009 (aged 39)
- Occupation: Design director

Leo Obstbaum (October 26, 1969 – August 21, 2009) was an Argentine-born Spanish design director for the 2010 Winter Olympics in Vancouver, British Columbia, Canada, as part of the Vancouver Organizing Committee (VANOC). Obstbaum was responsible for designing many of the main symbols of the Vancouver Olympic Games including the Olympic and Paralympic medals, the design of the 2010 Olympic torch, and the 2010 Winter Olympic and Paralympic Games mascots.

Obstbaum was born in Buenos Aires, Argentina, in 1969. He moved to Barcelona, Spain, with his family when he was a child.

Obstbaum opened his first visual communication studio in 1990. He designed the wardrobe for the celebration of the anniversary of the 1992 Barcelona Olympics.

Obstbaum visited Vancouver, British Columbia, Canada, on his honeymoon and reportedly "fell in love" with the city. He moved to Vancouver from Spain in late 2005.

Obstbaum was hired by the Vancouver Organizing Committee (VANOC) in June 2006 as the director of design for the upcoming 2010 Winter Olympics. He oversaw the design and creation of many of the most important symbols of the 2010 Olympics, including the 2010 Olympics mascots, the Olympic torch and the medals which were awarded to the athletes.

Leo Obstbaum died unexpectedly on August 21, 2009, at the age of 39. He was survived by his wife and daughter.

The VANOC released a statement noting Obstbaum's contributions to the Vancounver Olympics, "Obstbaum's design leadership and influence are evident throughout VANOC's visual identity, including such iconic elements as the mascots, the Look of the Games, the torch designs, and Olympic and Paralympic medals (yet to be unveiled)." Likewise, an internal message sent to members of the VANOC its chief executive officer John Furlong read, "Leo is everywhere you look, in every colour, every texture, in every little bit of Vancouver 2010...Leo led and influenced the design of some of the most iconic pieces of the 2010 Winter Games. His spirit and daring inspiration has touched absolutely everything and because of him memories of the Games will live on for generations, a true enduring legacy of what went on here in Vancouver."
